= Achmeatoren =

Building in Leeuwarden, Netherlands

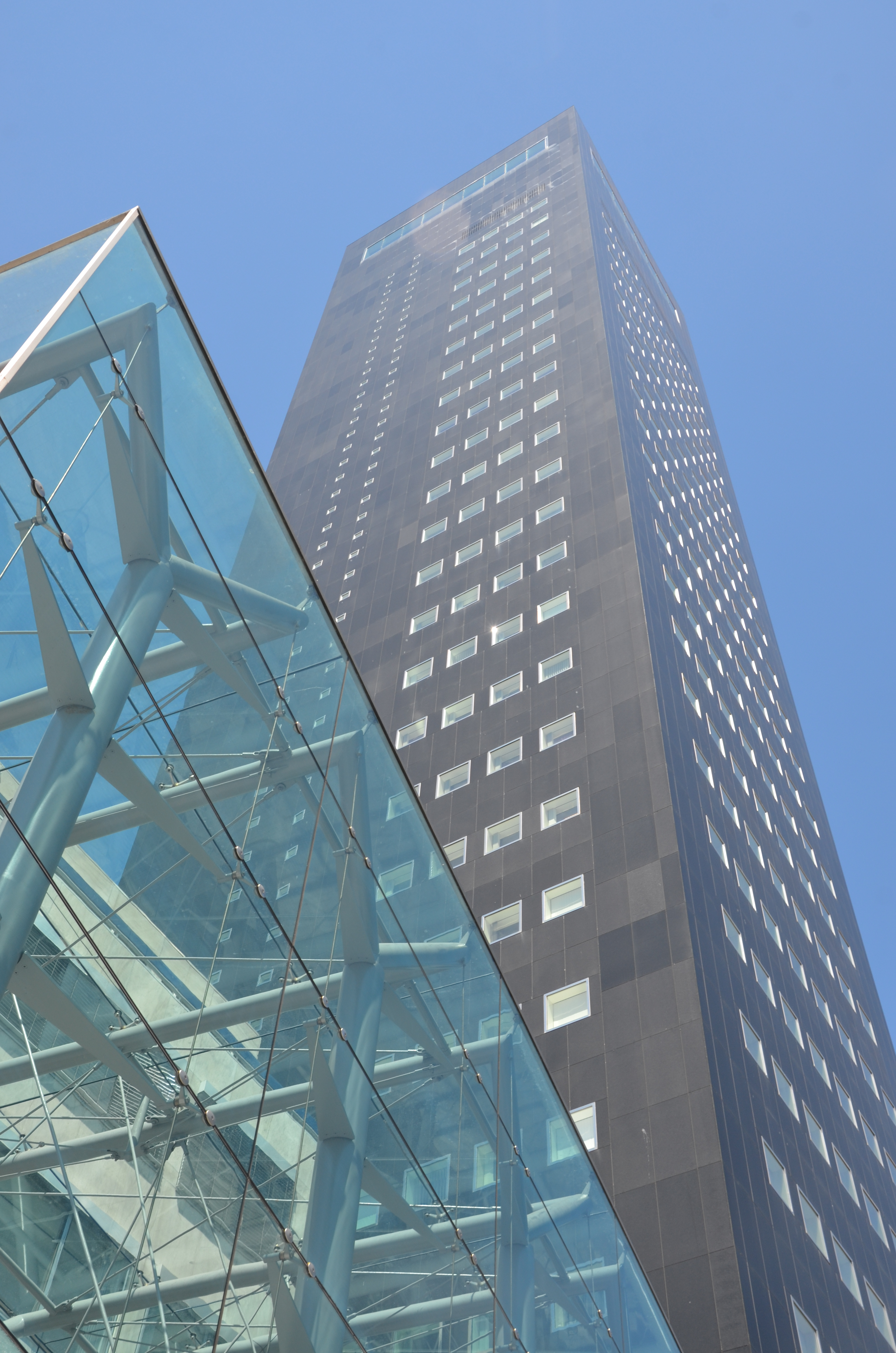

General information
- Status: In use
- Type: Offices
- Location: Leeuwarden, Friesland, Netherlands, Sophialaan 2, 8911AE Leeuwarden, Leeuwarden, Netherlands
- Coordinates: 53°11′53″N 5°47′31″E
- Construction started: 1999
- Topped-out: 2001
- Opened: 2002
- Owner: Achmea Holding NV

Height
- Height: 114.6 m (376 ft)

Technical details
- Floor count: 26 (two underground floors excluded)
- Floor area: 10,000 m²

Design and construction
- Architecture firm: Abe Bonnema; Jan van der Leij

Achmeatoren (Dutch for Achmea Tower) is an office building in Leeuwarden, Friesland, the Netherlands. The Achmeatoren was opened in 2002. and is 115 meters (377 ft) tall, having 26 floors. It is the 23rd tallest building in the Netherlands, and the tallest in the northern part of the country—visible from a large part of Friesland in clear weather. The building was commissioned by Achmea and designed by renowned Dutch architects Abe Bonnema and Jan van der Leij from Bonnema Architects in Hardegarijp. Since its completion the building has lost its granite plates three times but no one has ever been injured.

The slender tower dominates the skyline of Leeuwarden and works in the horizontal Frisian landscape as a striking beacon that is visible from a great distance. The building consists of two volumes of different heights that are, as it were, pushed into each other. The highest part is covered with black granite, the lower with grey granite.

Both building parts are placed on high legs over a steel and glass substructure. An arcade in this substructure accompanies the pedestrian route between station and city center. At the top of the tower there is a semi-public space with panoramic views of the city and countryside. Due to the interplay of a fickle office market, flexible labor and advancing automation, not all office space in the Achmeatoren is in continuous use.

== Brief history ==
In the strip between Lange Marktstraat and Willemskade, the original 19th-century buildings had to make way for new construction for the insurance industry. Bonnema designed offices for OBF (1985) and FBTO (1986), companies that were later absorbed by Achmea.

During a construction wave in the 1990s, the office strip in its entirety was designated an Achmea Master Plan. Bonnema Architecten made the various buildings within this planning area into a family. Two office towers designed by Bonnema were also added, the Avéro Tower (1991) and the Achmeatoren (2001).

== Companies ==
A range of different companies, along with a Tourist Information Centre (Dutch: VVV) on the ground floor, are located within the Achmeatoren; Deloitte, FBTO, AppMachine and De Friesland.

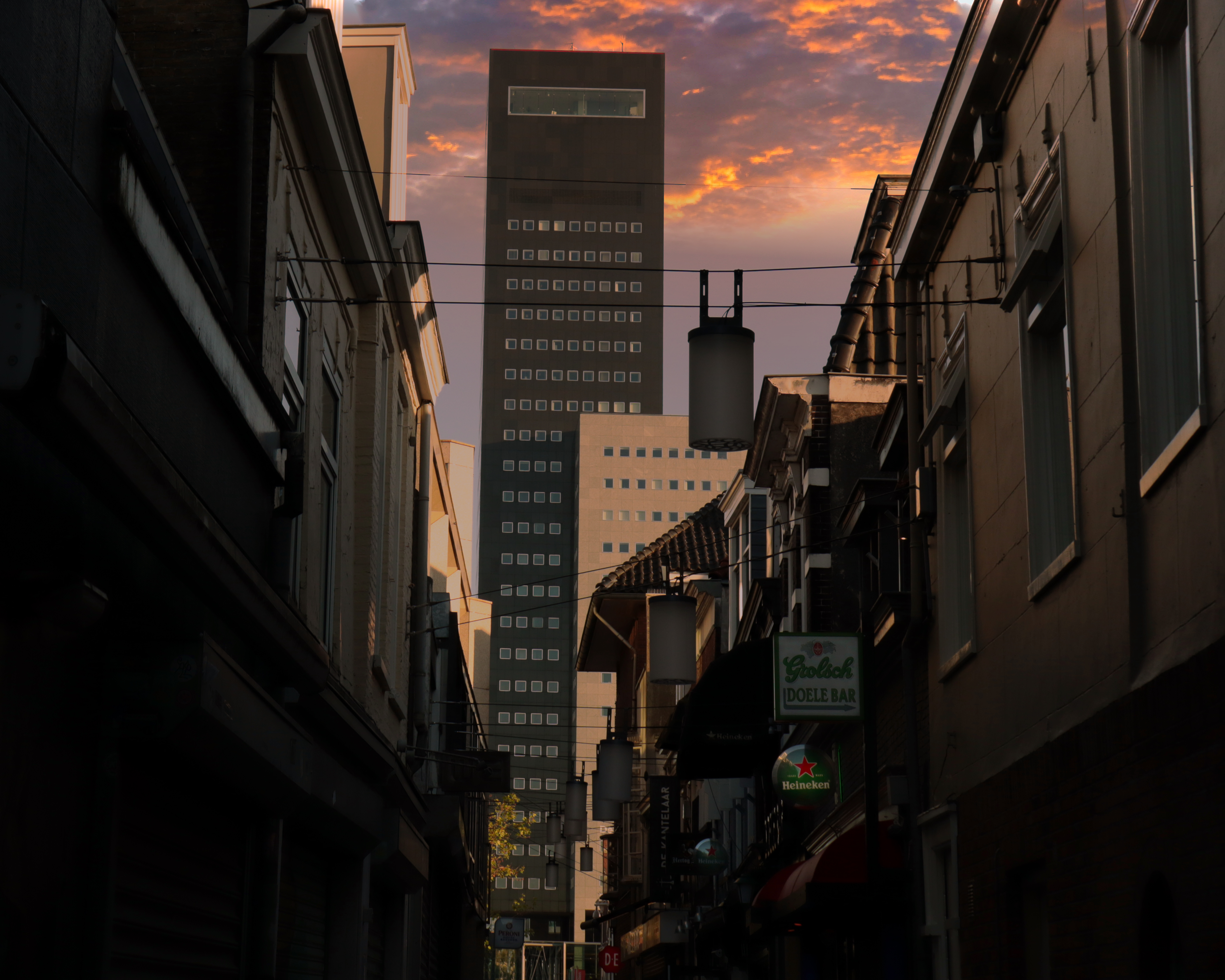

== Location ==
The Achmeatoren is located at Sophialaan 2 (8911AE Leeuwarden), in front of Station Leeuwarden, just outside of the city center.

== Objections ==
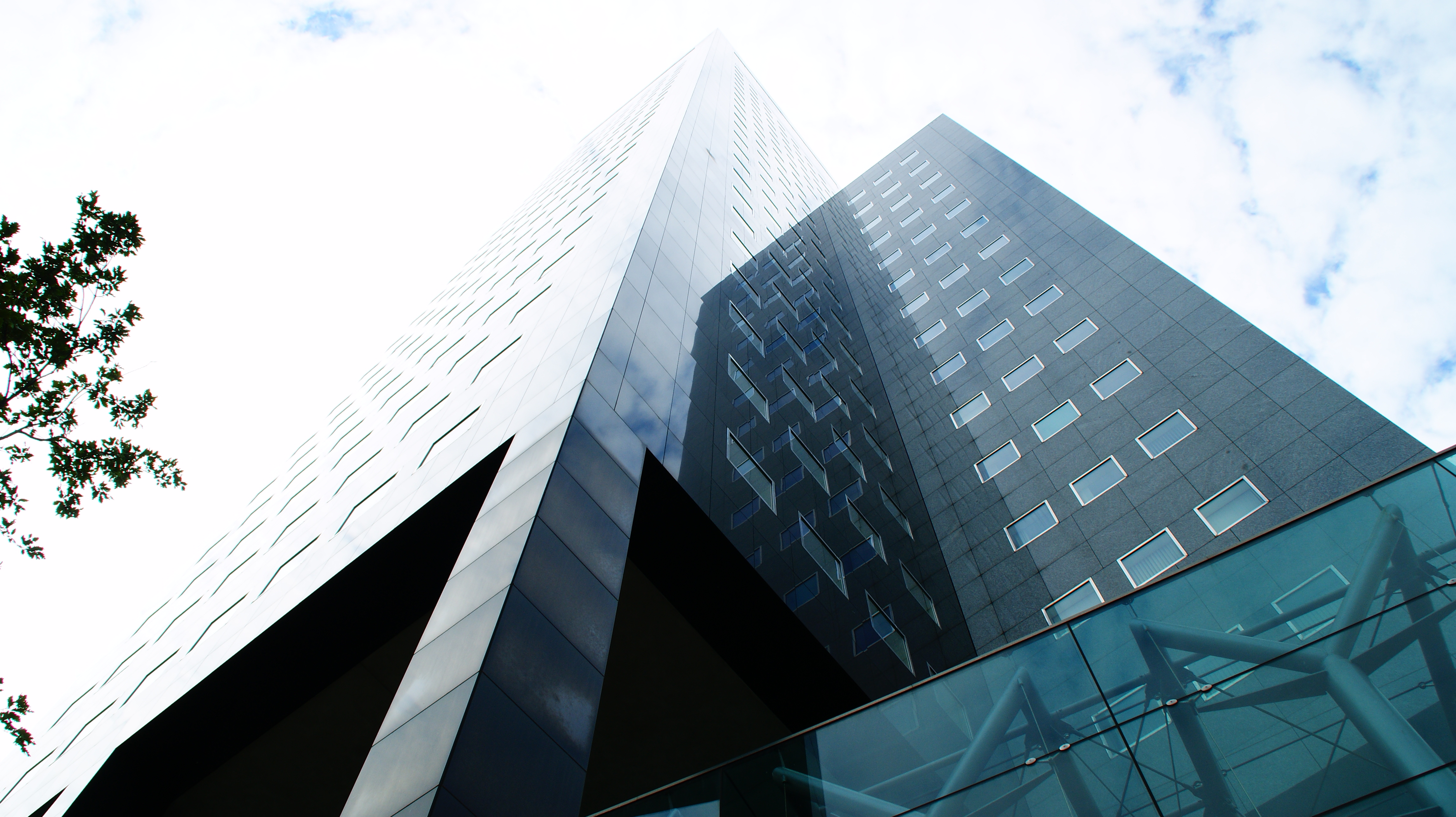

The construction of the Achmeatoren in 1999 raised objections from the aviation side in connection with the nearby military air base in Leeuwarden. However, construction was allowed because of the social importance. Architectural firm Bonnema reluctantly placed four lights at the corners. Later they were replaced by a double-lined neon contour that runs all the way around the top of the tower. Initially this was green, but it was later replaced by red light.

== Gallery ==
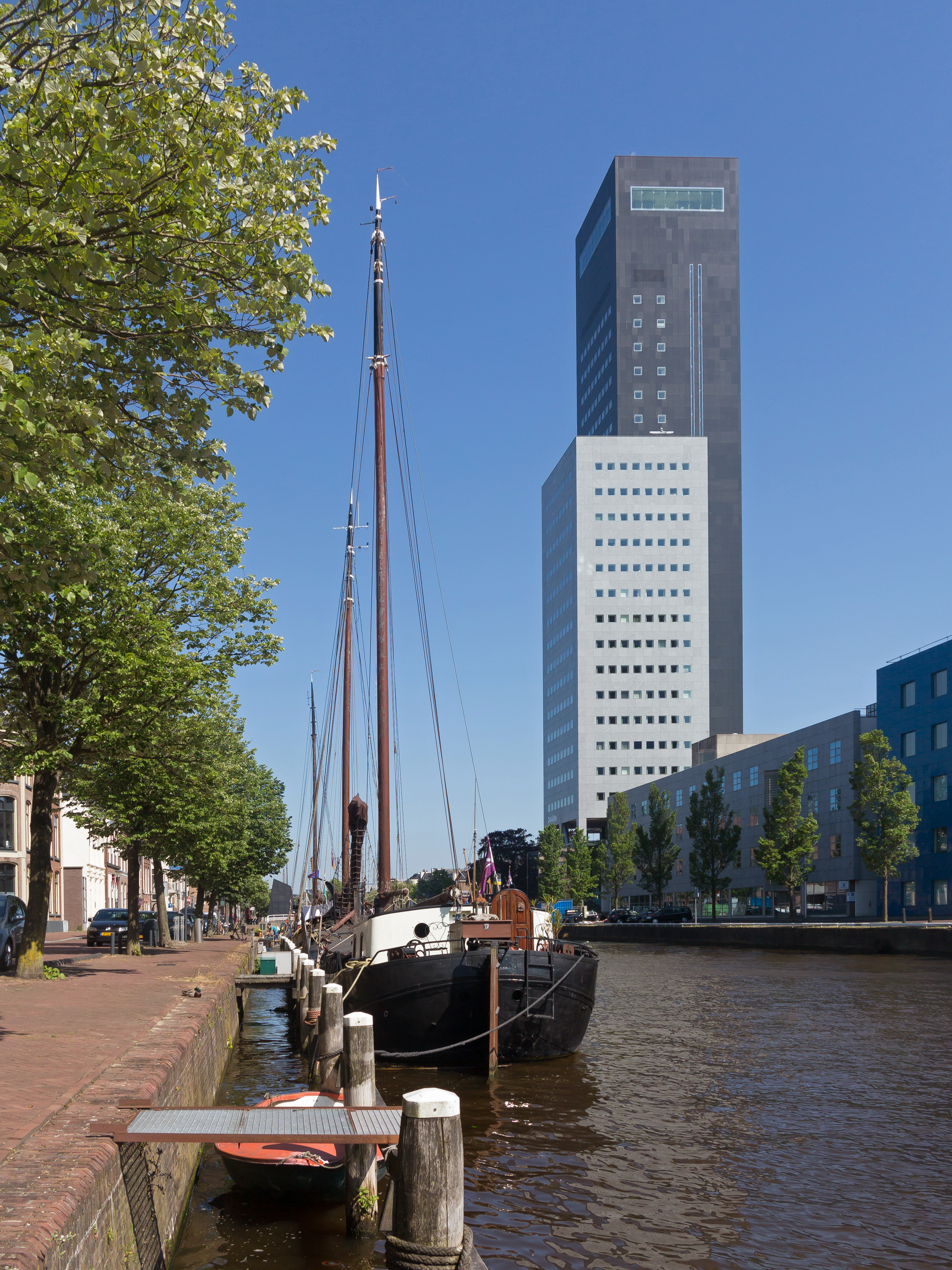
Achmeatoren

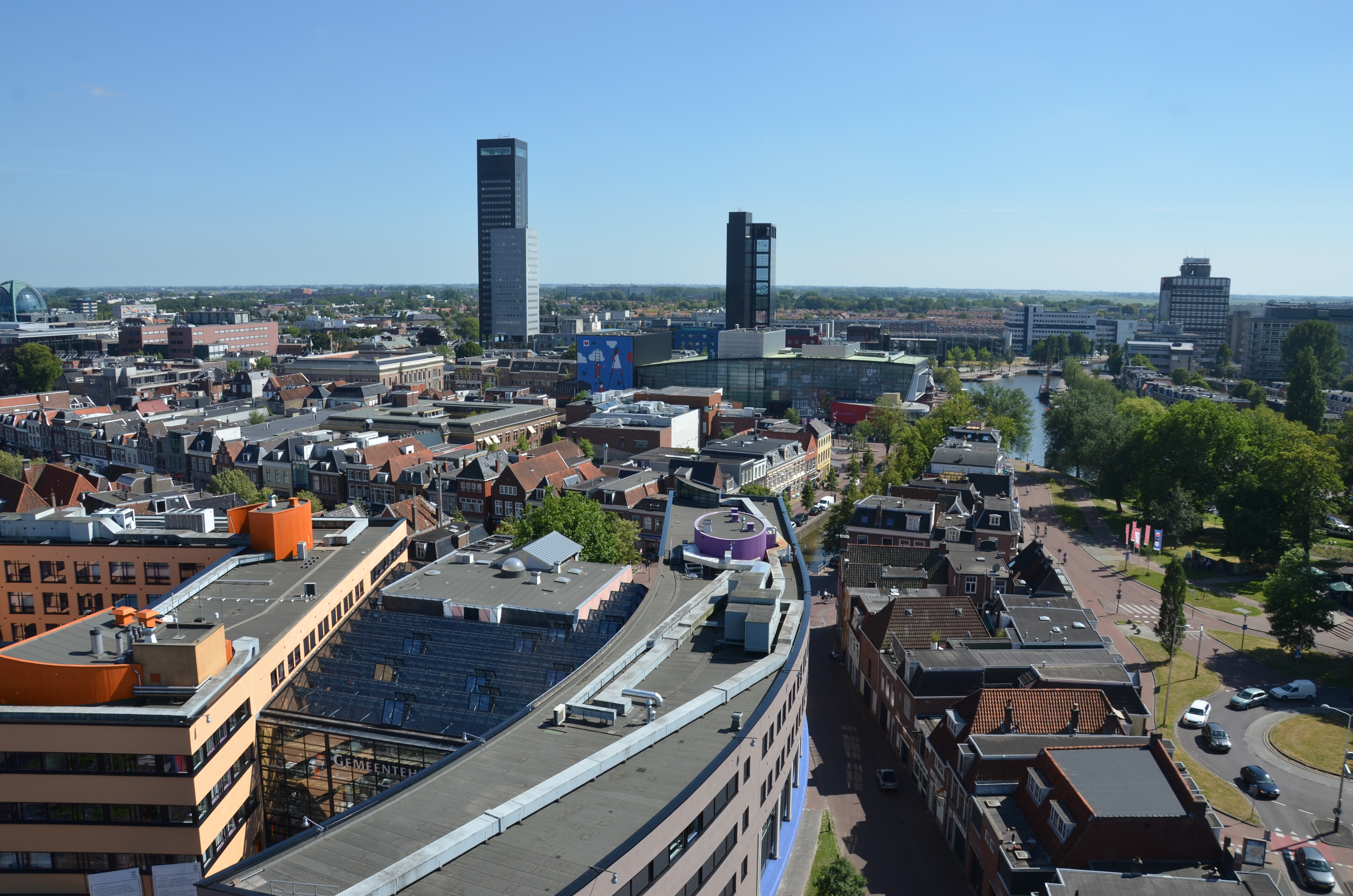
Achmeatoren and Leeuwarden centre from the Oldehove

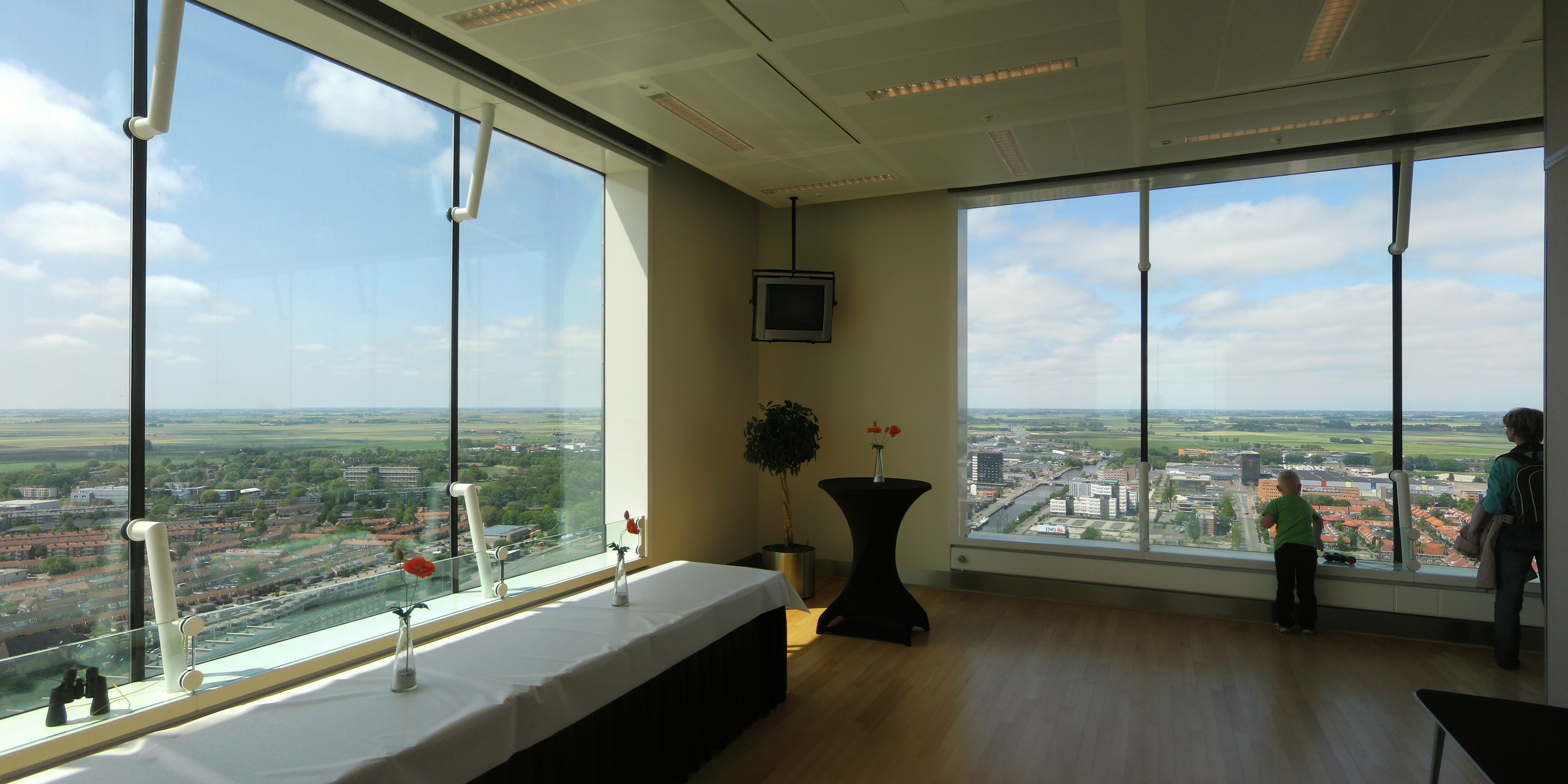
Observatory level located on the 26th floor

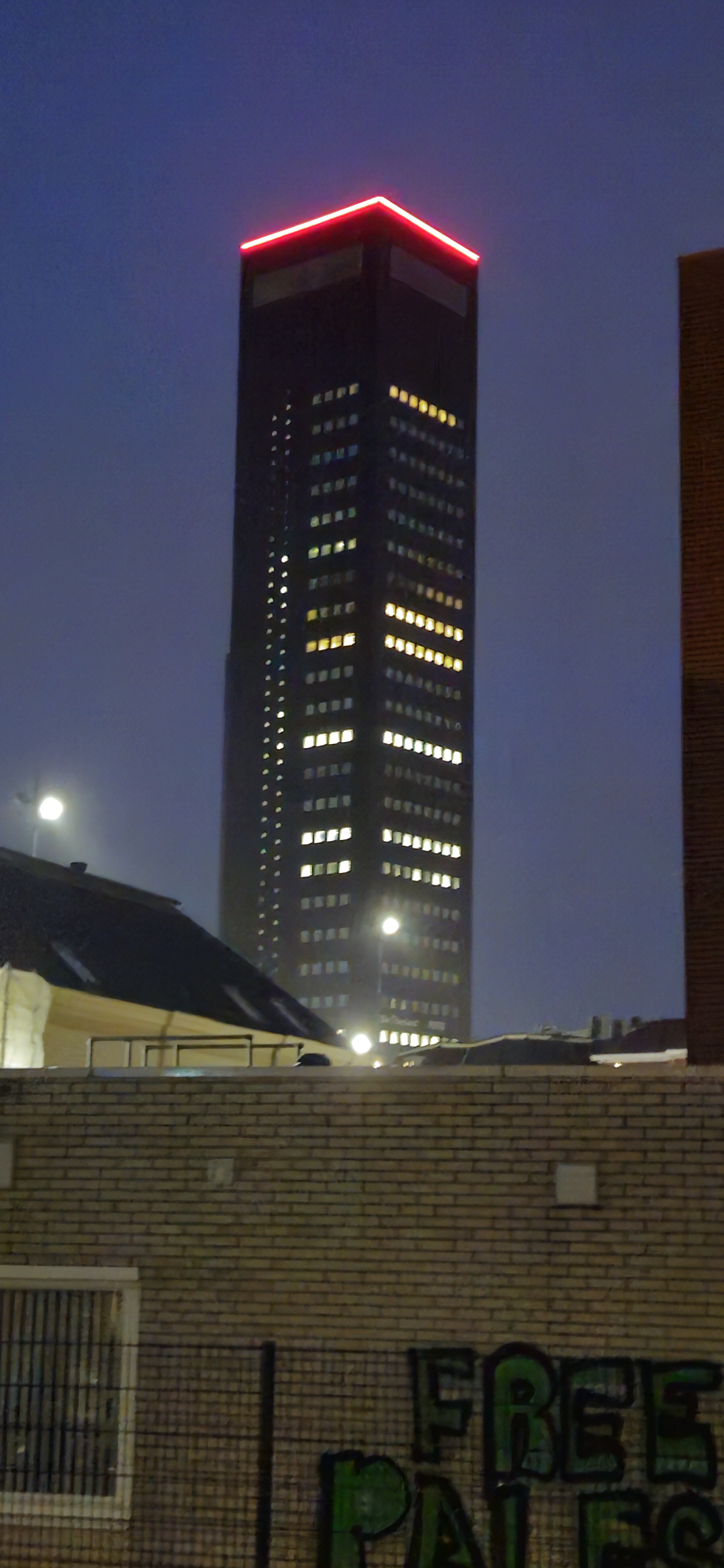
Achmeatoren at night

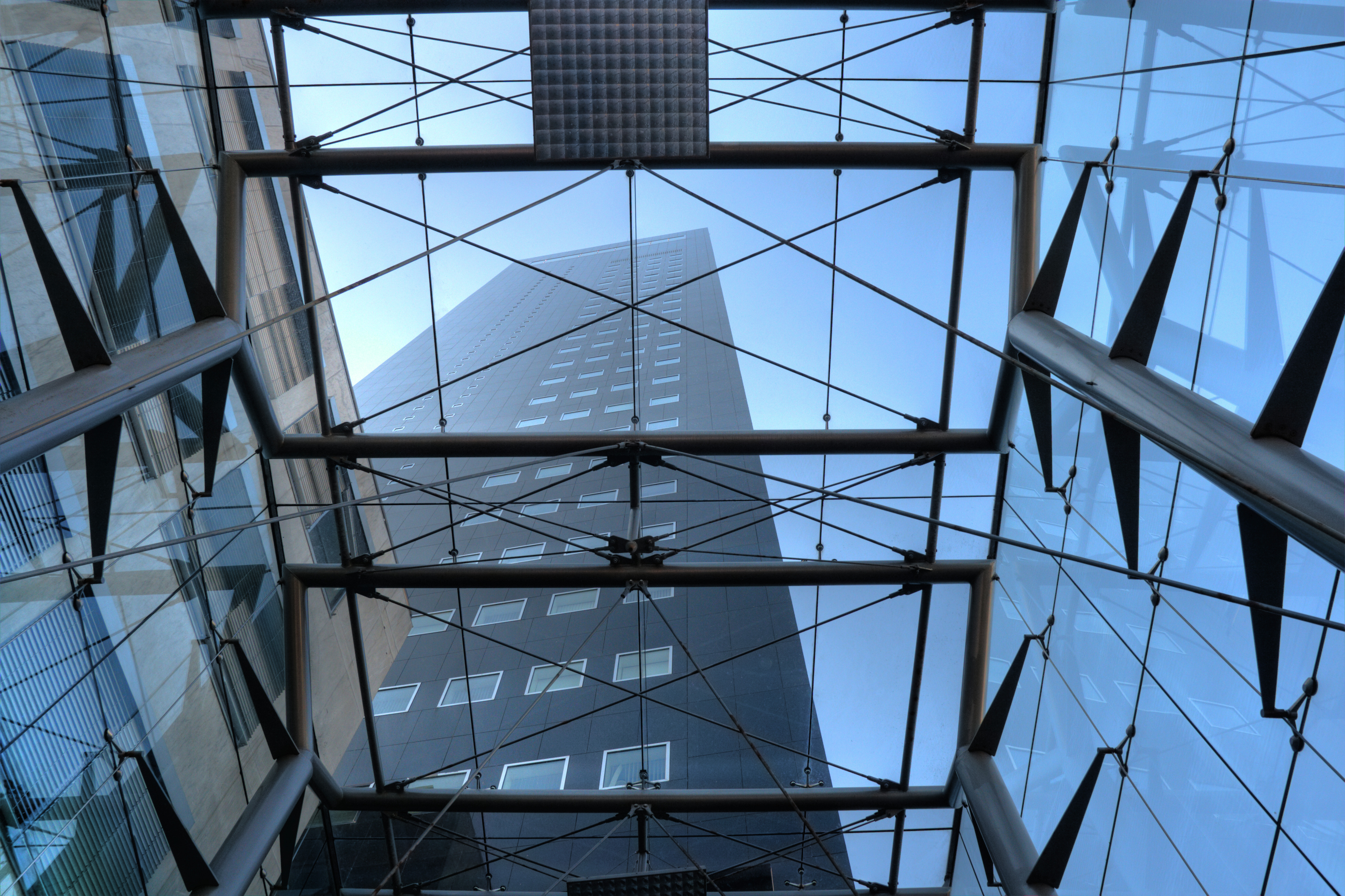

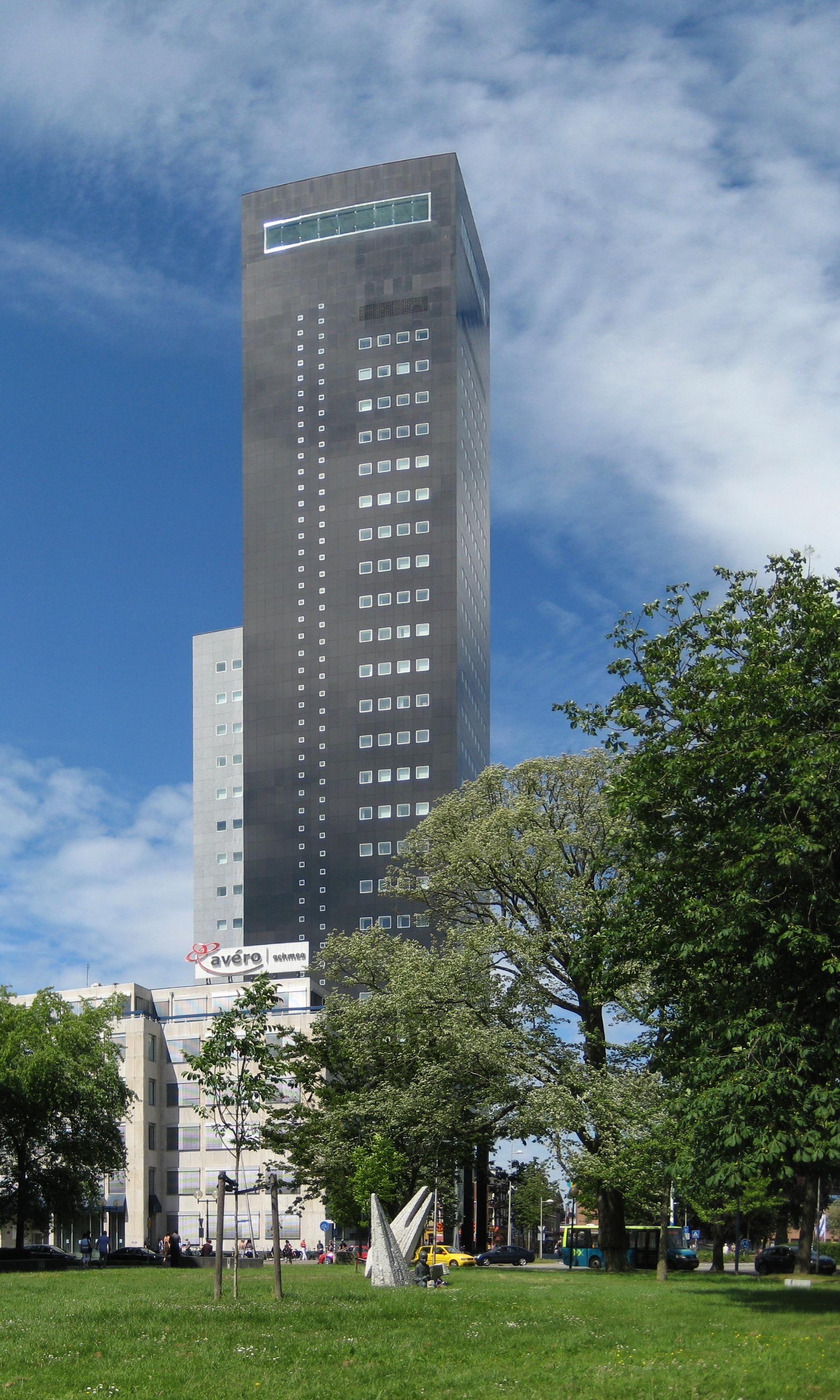

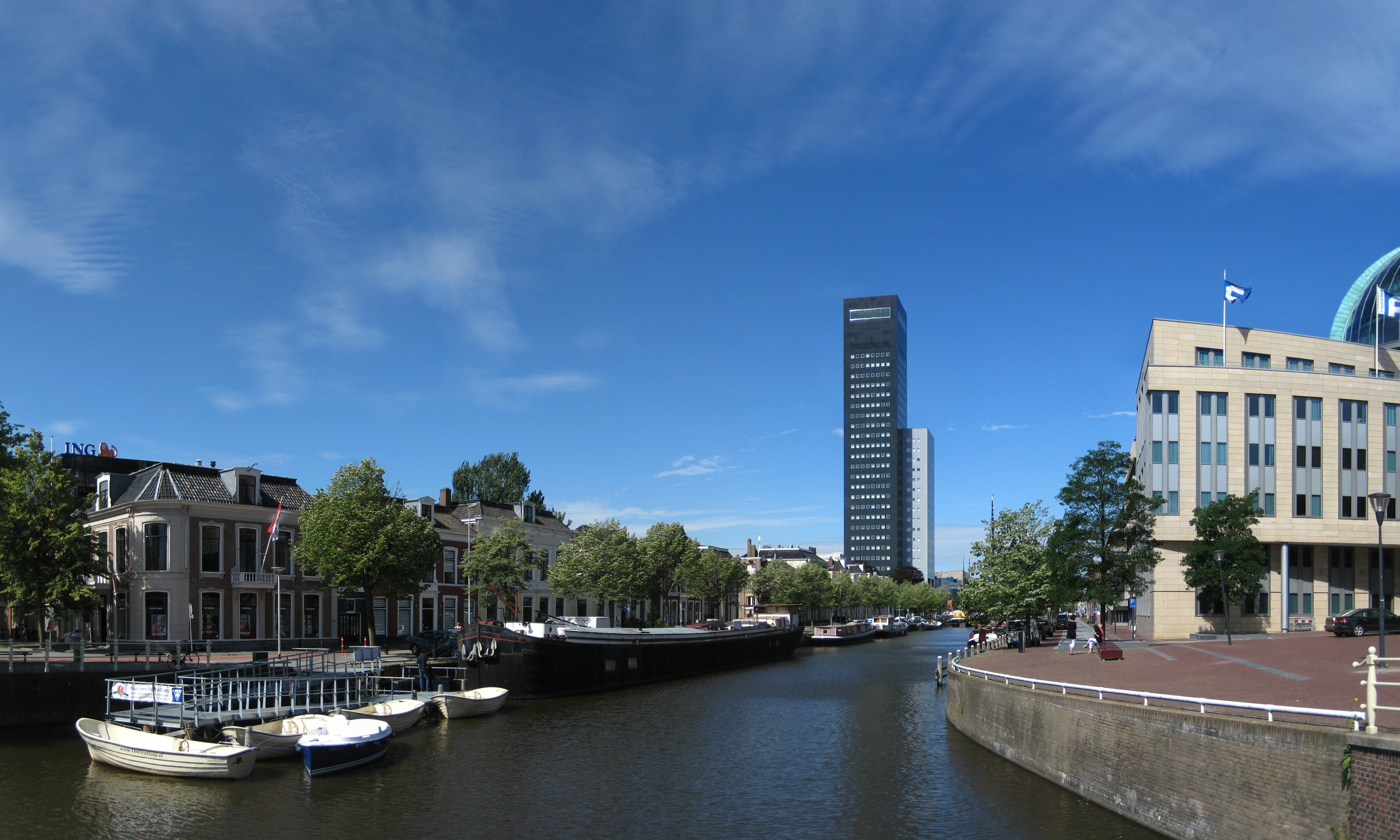

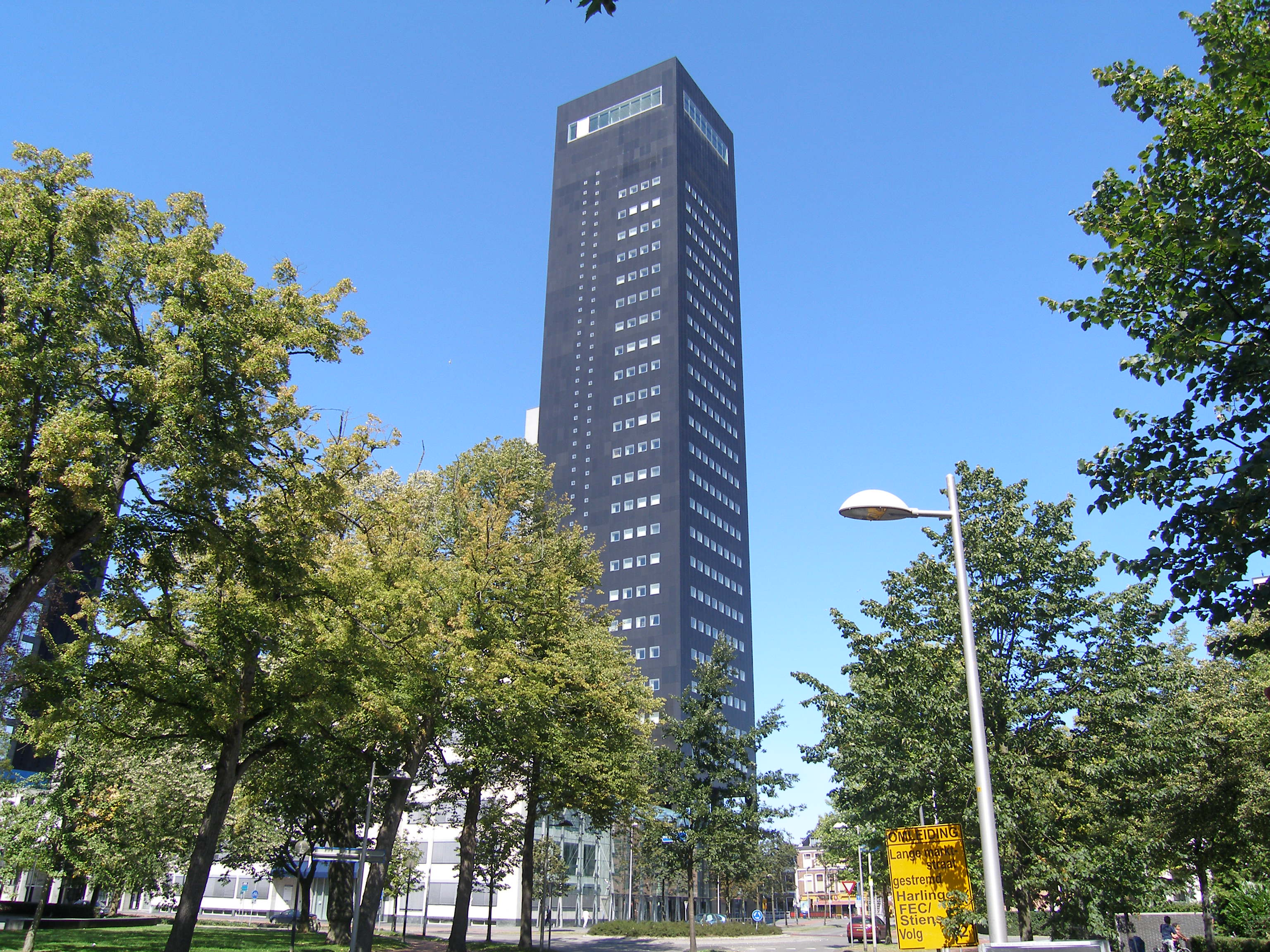

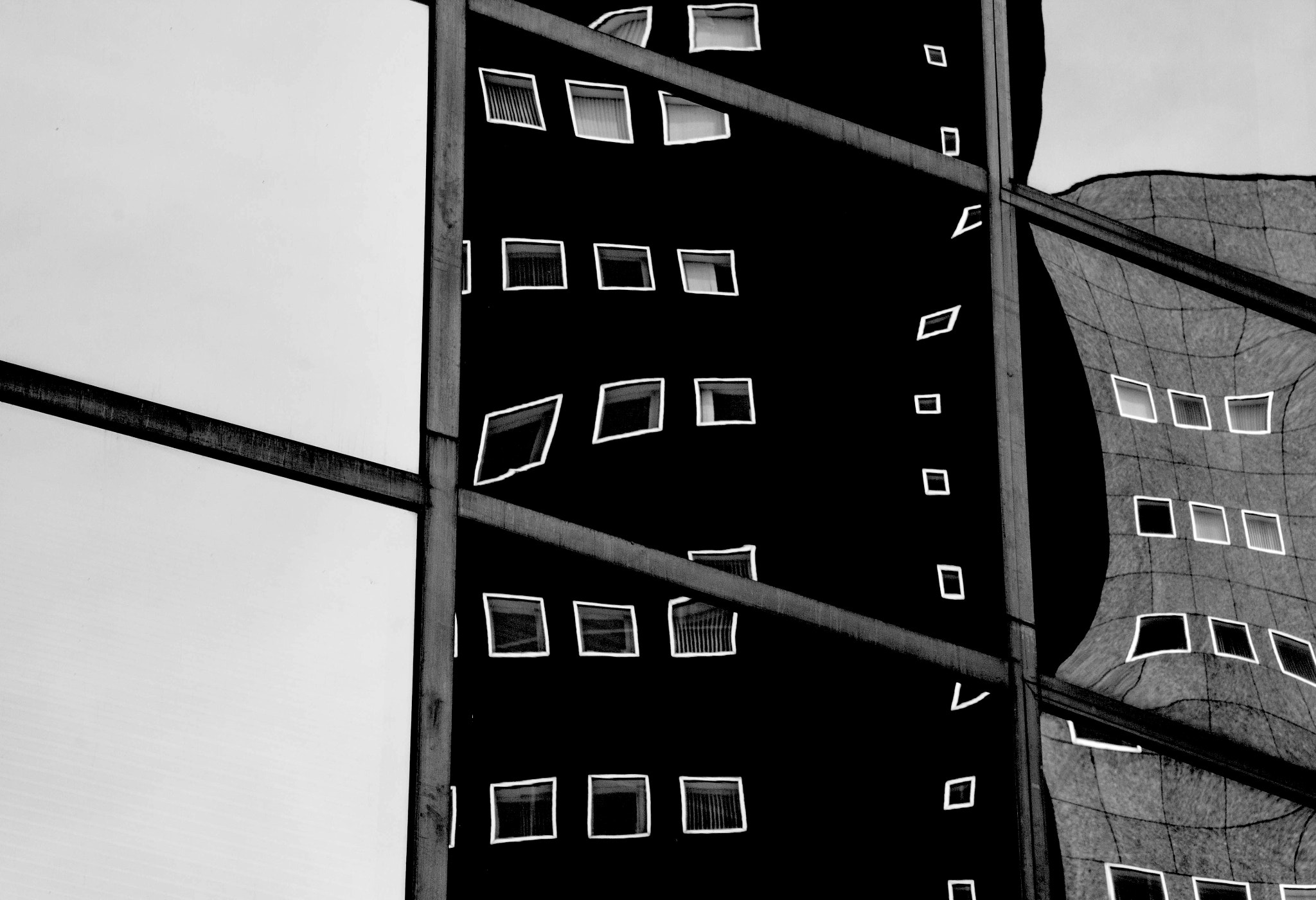

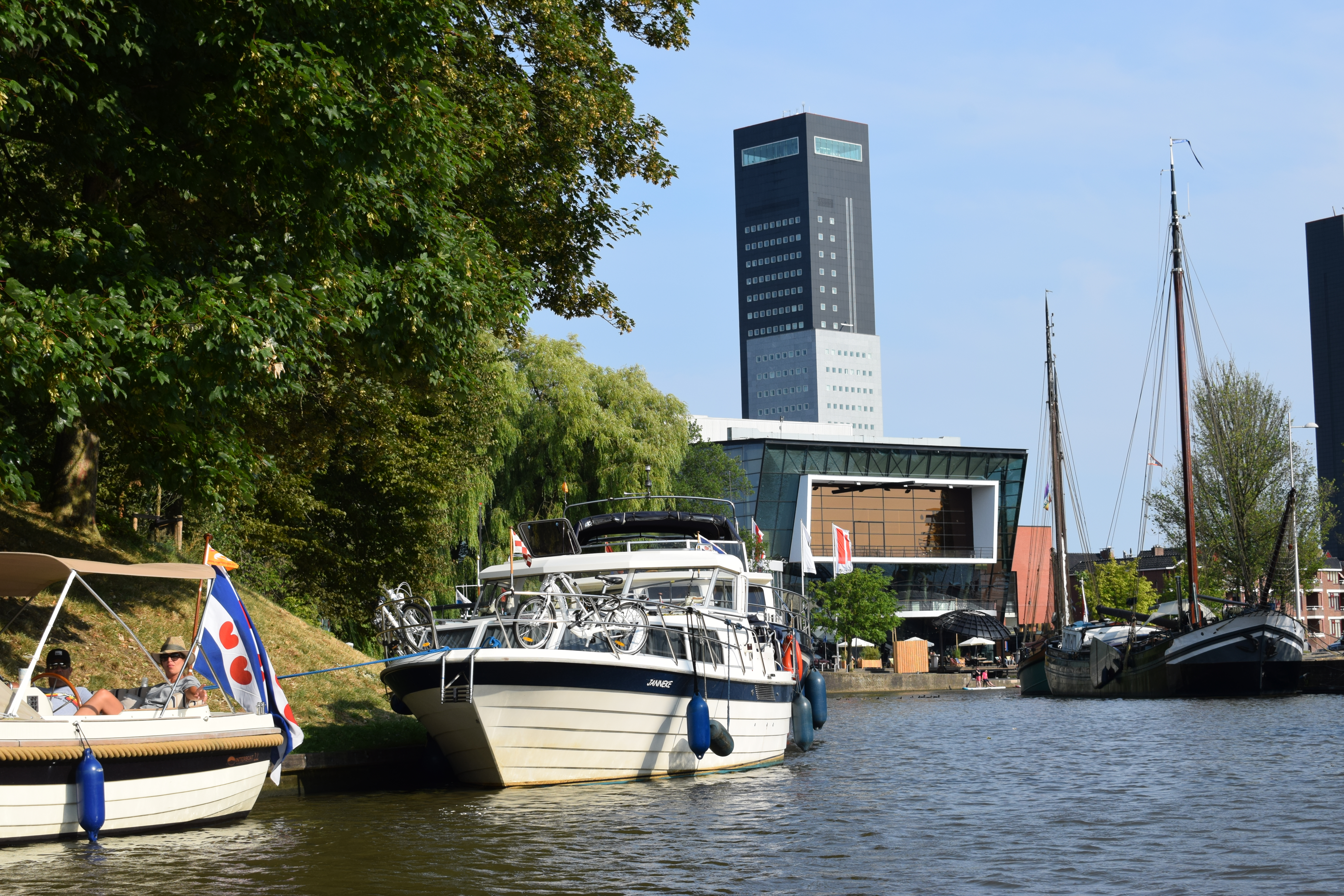

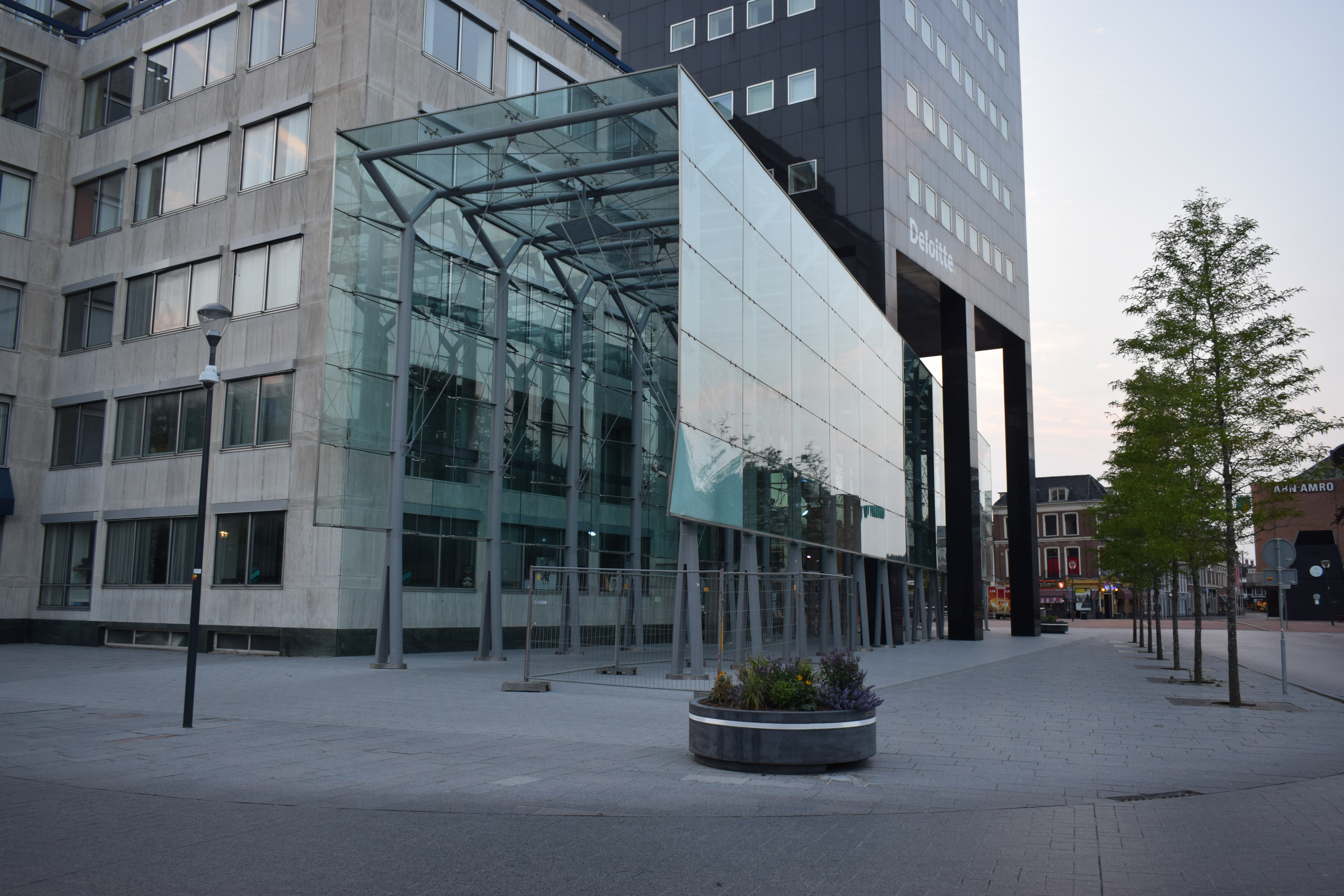
