= Dutch School =

Dutch School may refer to:

- Dutch school (cartography)
- Dutch School (music)
- Dutch School (painting)
- Dutch School (architecture)
- Dutch School (sculpture)

Dutch school languages German French English Dutch
