= List of Dutch architects =

Following is a list of Dutch architects in alphabetical order by birth century.

== Born in the 15th century ==
- Jan Heyns (14??–1516)
- Jacob van Aaken (?-1532)

== Born in the 16th century ==
- Bartholomeus van Bassen (c.1590–1652)
- Salomon de Bray (1597–1664)
- Jacob van Campen (1596–1657)
- Lieven de Key (c.1560–1627)
- Hendrick de Keyser (1565–1621)
- Pieter de Keyser (c.1595–1676)
- Thomas de Keyser (c.1596–1667)
- Hans Vredeman de Vries (1527–c.1607)

== Born in the 17th century ==
- Harmen van Bol'es (1689–1764)
- Simon Bosboom (1614–1662)
- Adriaan Dortsman (1635–1682)
- Tielman van Gameren (1632–1706)
- Daniël Marot (1661–1752)
- Maurits Post (1645–1677)
- Pieter Post (1608–1669)
- Steven Vennecool (1657–1719)
- Justus Vingboons (c.1620–c.1698)
- Philips Vingboons (c.1607–1678)

== Born in the 18th century ==
- Jan Bouman (1706–1776)
- Abraham van der Hart (1747–1820)
- Jacob Otten Husly (1738–1796)
- Leendert Viervant (1752–1801)

== Born in the 19th century ==
- Albert Aalbers (1897–1961)
- Gerrit van Arkel (1858–1918)
- Herman Ambrosius Jan Baanders (1876–1953)
- Herman Hendrik Baanders (1849–1905)
- Karel de Bazel (1869–1923)
- Hendrik Petrus Berlage (1856–1934)
- Adrianus Bleijs (1842–1912)
- Berend Tobia Boeyinga (1886–1969)
- Alphons Boosten (1893–1951)
- Jo van den Broek (1898–1978)
- Jan Buijs (1889–1961)
- Eduard Cuypers (1859–1927)
- Pierre Cuypers (1827–1921)
- Theo van Doesburg (1883–1931)
- Jan Drummen (1891–1966)
- Willem Marinus Dudok (1884–1974)
- Jan Duiker (1890–1935)
- Cornelis van Eesteren (1897–1988)
- Harry Elte (1880–1944)
- Marinus Jan Granpré Molière (1883–1972)
- Jan Gratama (1877–1947)
- Quirinus Harder (1801–1880)
- Robert van 't Hoff (1887–1979)
- Thomas Karsten (1884–1945)
- Michel de Klerk (1884–1923)
- Piet Kramer (1881–1961)
- Johannes Bernardus van Loghem (1881–1940)
- Henri Maclaine Pont (1885–1971)
- Johan van der Mey (1878–1949)
- J.J.P. Oud (1890–1963)
- Frits Peutz (1896–1974)
- Henri Pieck (1895–1972)
- Sybold van Ravesteyn (1889–1983)
- Gerrit Rietveld (1888–1964)
- Abraham Salm (1857–1915)
- C.P. Wolff Schoemaker (1882–1949)
- Margaret Staal-Kropholler (1891–1966)
- Mart Stam (1899–1986)
- Ad van der Steur (1893–1953)
- Jan Stuyt (1868–1934)
- Alfred Tepe (1840–1920)
- Jan Verheul (1860–1948)
- Leendert van der Vlugt (1894–1936)
- Hendrik Wijdeveld (1885–1987)
- Jan Wils (1891–1972)

== Born in the 20th century ==
- Wiel Arets (born 1955)
- Jaap Bakema (1914–1981)
- Ben van Berkel (born 1957)
- Piet Blom (1934–1999)
- Abe Bonnema (1926–2001)
- Caroline Bos (born 1959)
- Johannes Brinkman (1902–1949)
- Pi de Bruijn (born 1942)
- Kees Christiaanse (born 1953)
- Jo Coenen (born 1949)
- Frits van Dongen (born 1946)
- Erick van Egeraat (born 1956)
- Aldo van Eyck (1918–1999)
- N. John Habraken (1928–2023)
- Hubert-Jan Henket (born 1940)
- Herman Hertzberger (born 1932)
- Jan Hoogstad (born 1930)
- Francine Houben (born 1955)
- Jan van der Jagt (1924–2001)
- Rem Koolhaas (born 1944)
- Jón Kristinsson (born 1936)
- Winy Maas (born 1959)
- Hugh Maaskant (1907–1977)
- Jakoba Mulder (1900 – 1988)
- Siegfried Nassuth (1922–2005)
- Wim Quist (1930–2022)
- Jacob van Rijs (born 1965)
- Susan Hendrik van Sitteren (1904–1968)
- Sjoerd Soeters (born 1947)
- Machiel Spaan (born 1966)
- Lars Spuybroek (born 1959)
- Nathalie de Vries (born 1965)
- Allert Warners (1914–1980)
- Wilfried van Winden (born 1955)
- René van Zuuk (born 1962)
- Misak Terzibasiyan (born 1964)

== See also ==
- List of architects
- List of Dutch people
- List of Dutch urban designers and planners
- Category:Architecture firms of the Netherlands
