= Warners =

Warners can refer to:

- Warners, New York, hamlet in New York state, U.S.
- Warners (surname)

== See also ==
- Warners Bay, suburb of the City of Lake Macquarie, New South Wales, Australia
- Warner (disambiguation)
