= Warners (surname) =

Warners is a surname. Notable people with the surname include:

- Allert Warners, Dutch architect
- Chiel Warners (born 1978), Dutch decathlete
- Jeanne A. W. Warners, Dutch-born founder of the Miramar Zeemuseum
