= Oldehove =

Oldehove may refer to:

- Oldehove, Groningen, a village in the Netherlands
- Oldehove, Leeuwarden, a neighbourhood of Leeuwarden, the Netherlands
- Oldehove (tower), a tower in Leeuwarden
