= Jacob van Aaken =

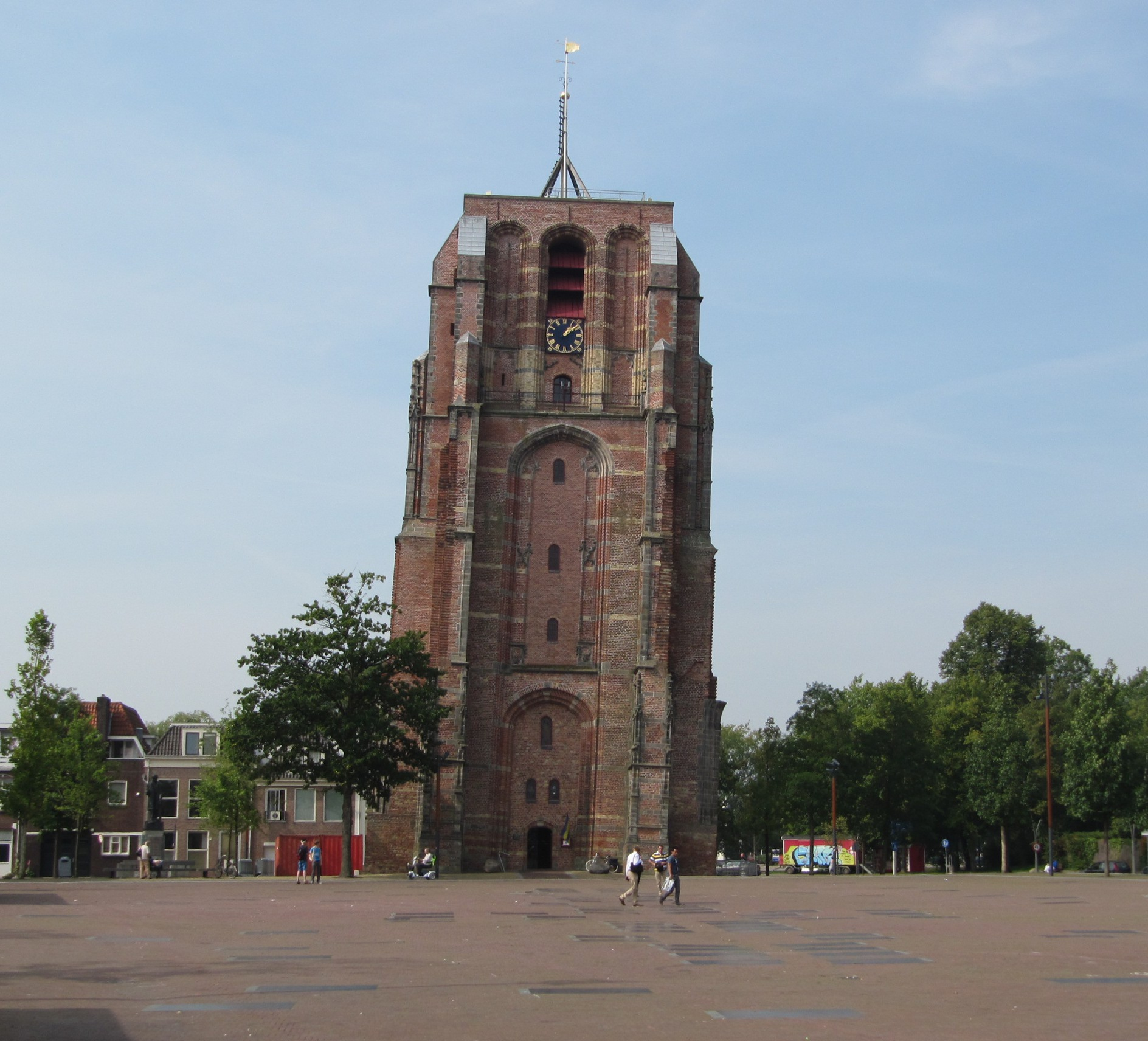
The Oldehove, Leeuwarden

Jacob van Aaken was an architect who worked in the Netherlands. He was the architect of the tower The Oldehove (De Oldehove), in the Frisian city of Leeuwarden Given his name, he possibly came from the German city Aachen.

== The Oldehove ==
On 28 May 1529, the city council of Leeuwarden chose van Aaken's design for a new church; van Aaken was simultaneously appointed as the architect overseeing its construction. According to a copy of the agreement (the original is lost) that is now archived in the Historisch Centrum Leeuwarden, van Aaken received 8 stuivers a day, accommodation in the shape of a house for the six years building of the tower, and 'fair, new clothing' (in Dutch: 'eerlyk niuw kleed'.)

Soon after the completion of the building, the tower began to subside. Van Aaken tried to compensate for this by adding more material to the building. This caused the squint position of the tower, which exists to this day. In 1532, Van Aaken died, reputedly from his bad temper. Cornelis Frederiks continued the work in Leeuwarden after van Aaken's death.
