= List of Dutch urban designers and planners =

Following is a list of Dutch urban designers and planners in alphabetical order:

A - B - C - D - E - F - G - H - I - J - K - L - M - N - O - P - Q - R - S - T - U - V - W - X - Y - Z

== B ==
- Jacob B. Bakema
- Hendrik Petrus Berlage
- Jo van den Broek
- Pi de Bruijn

== C ==
- Kees Christiaanse
- Jo Coenen

== D ==
- Willem Marinus Dudok

== E ==
- Aldo van Eyck

== G ==
- Marinus Jan Granpré Molière

== K ==
- Rem Koolhaas

== O ==
- Jacobus Oud

== Q ==
- Quadrat

== S ==
- Sjoerd Soeters

== W ==
- West 8

== See also ==
- List of urban designers and planners
- List of urban theorists
- List of Dutch architects
