= Wilfried van Winden =

Dutch architect (born 1955)

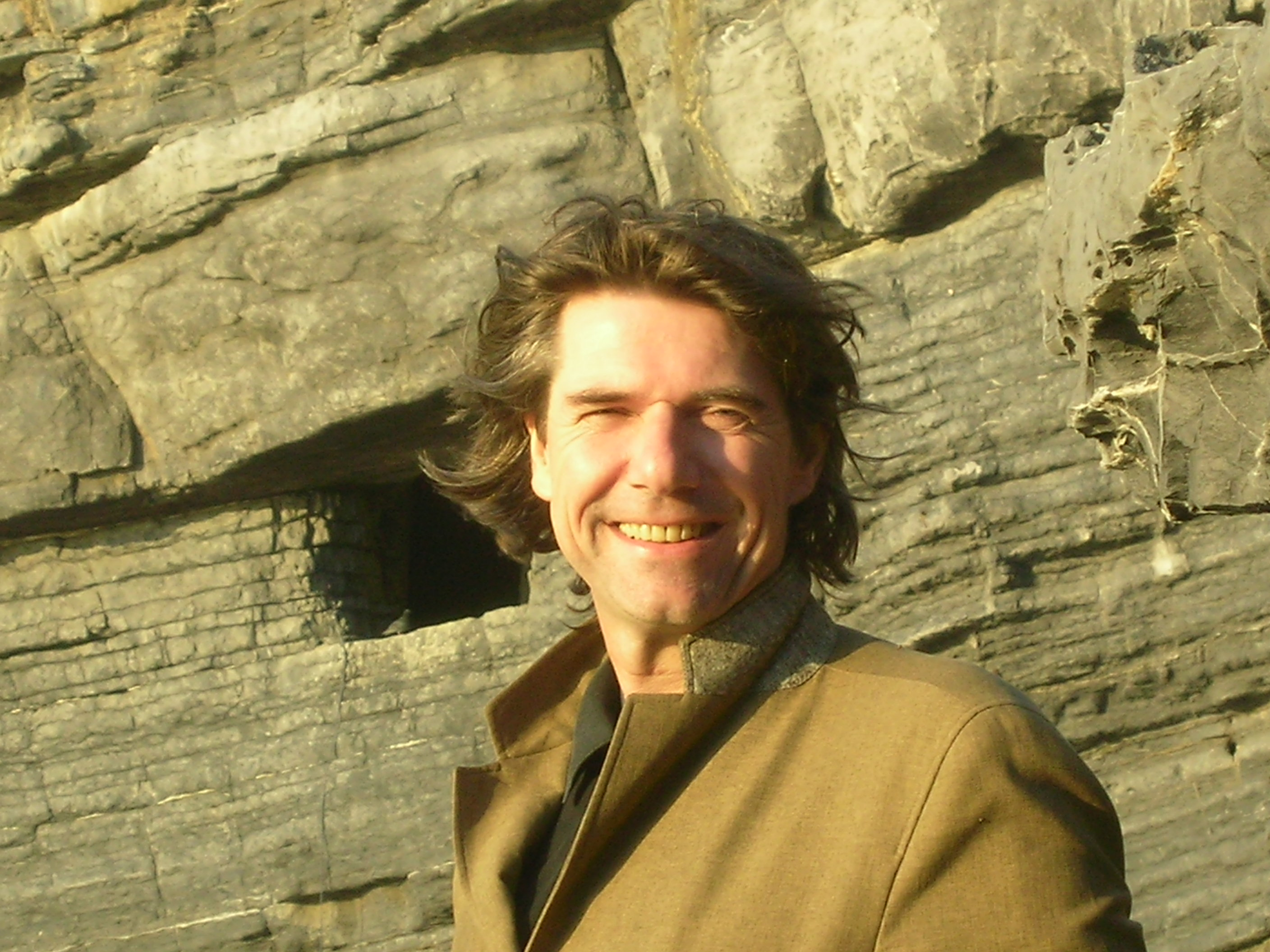

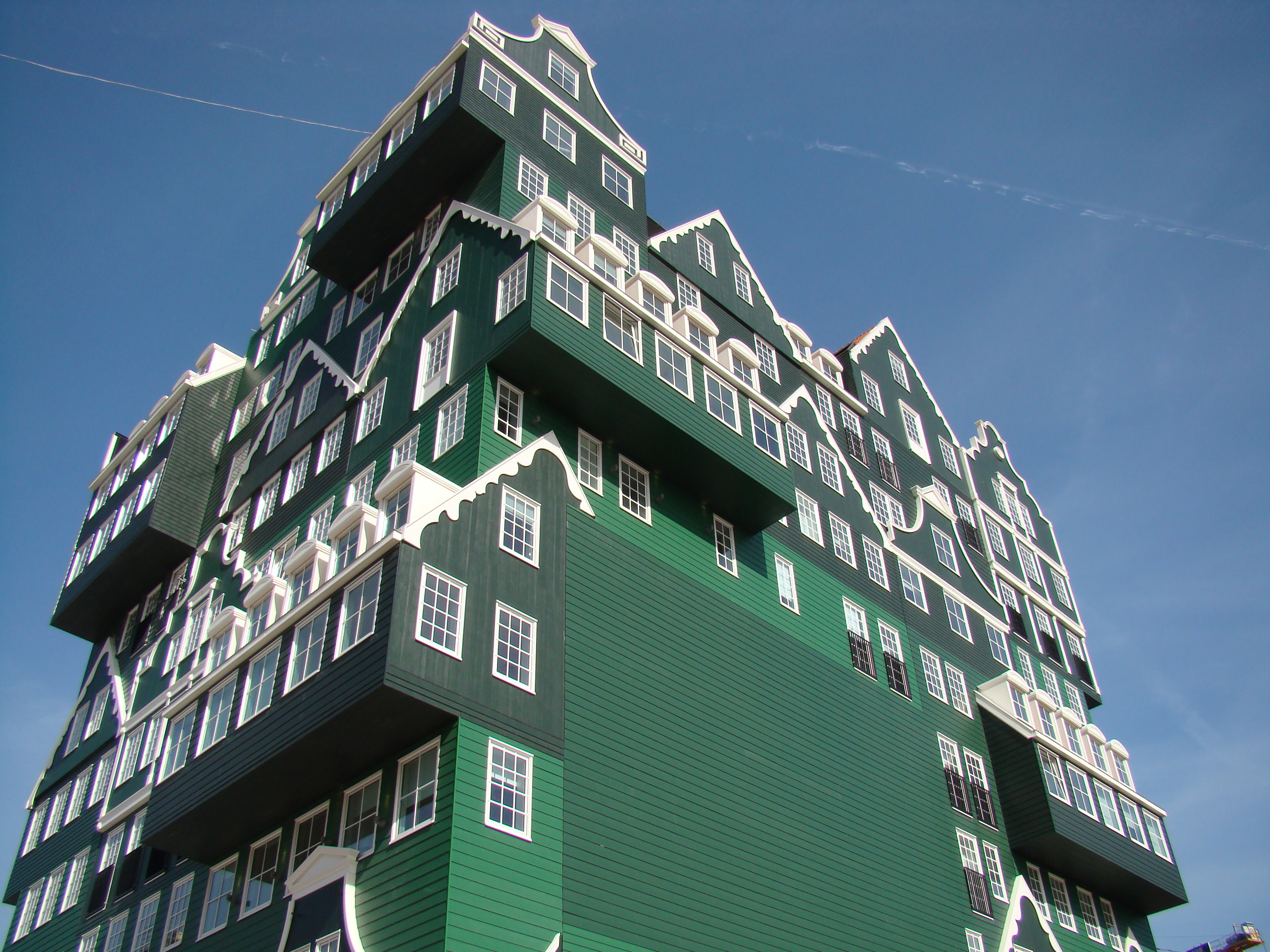
Inntel Hotel in Zaandam

Wilfried van Winden (born 24 November 1955) is a Dutch architect who is particularly celebrated for his design for the Inntel Hotel in Zaandam.

== Career ==
Born in Delft on 24 November 1955, van Winden studied architecture at Delft University of Technology (TU Delft), graduating in 1987. He co-founded the Molenaar & Van Winden Architecten bureau in Delft in 1985. Van Winden left this practice in January 2009 to establish a new, independent bureau WAM architecten.

Besides his design for the Inntel Hotel, Wilfried van Winden's major projects include the Essalam Mosque (2010) in Rotterdam, De Oriënt residential complex (2011) in the Transvaal district of The Hague, and De Marquant residential development (2007) in Breda.

Alongside his work as a designer, Wilfried van Winden conducts research and writes articles and essays on a number of subjects. A comprehensive study into the design of Dutch and German motorways resulted in the 2007 publication De diabolische snelweg (The Diabolical Motorway; Rotterdam: 010 Publishers, 2007), which Van Winden co-authored with Wim Nijenhuis. In 2010, Van Winden published a theoretical tract, Fusion: Pleidooi voor een sierlijke architectuur in een open samenleving (Fusion: An appeal for a decorative architecture in an open society; Amsterdam: SUN Publishers, 2010), in which he advocated architecture without taboos. Fusion is a mindset rather than a style, a strategy that stands for an inventive way of mixing and interconnecting present and past, East and West, tradition and innovation, and high and low culture. The Inntel Hotel in Zaandam, the Essalam Mosque in Rotterdam and De Oriënt residential development in The Hague are examples of Fusion from his own portfolio.

== See also ==
- List of Dutch architects
