= Tresoar =

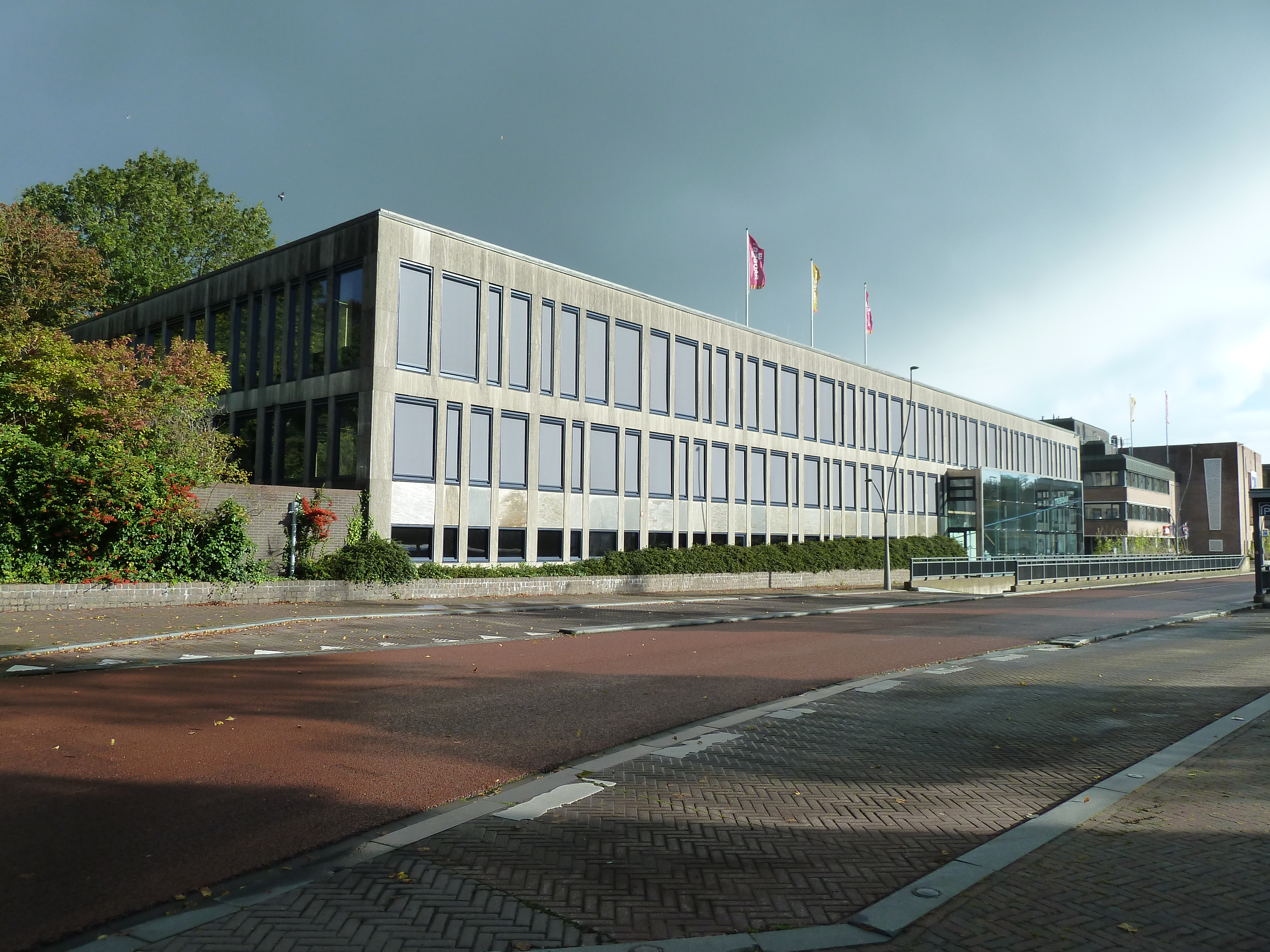
- Tresoar
- Established: 2002
- Location: Boterhoek 1, Leeuwarden, Netherlands
- Coordinates: 53.2035°N 5.790278°E
- Type: museum, archive
- Website: www.tresoar.nl/Pages/Default.aspx

Tresoar (West Frisian for "treasure") is the short name for the Frysk Histoarysk en Letterkundich Sintrum ("Frisian History and Literature Center") in Leeuwarden.

Tresoar manages digital archives about Friesland and its literature. There is a study room open to the public, and most catalogs are online and free to access. In addition to 2-dimensional material such as photographs, scanned books and documents, there is a growing collection of multi-media objects such as film and audio material that can also be searched and accessed online.

Tresoar was created through a merger in 2002 of the Frisian Literature Museum with the Provincial Library and the National Frisian Archives. Tresoar functions as a regional historical center with a small exposition hall (the "treasure room"), and is located at Boterhoek 1, Leeuwarden.

Since 2007, all 255 editions of the Leeuwarder Courant have been digitized and placed online.

== See also ==
- Historisch Centrum Leeuwarden
