= Jeanne A. W. Warners =

Dutch founder of a marine life museum

Jeanne Adriana Wilhelmina Warners
- Born: 3 August 1899; Leersum, Netherlands
- Died: 3 June 1986 (aged 86); Zwolle, Netherlands

Jeanne Adriana Wilhelmina Warners (3 August 1899 – 3 June 1986) was the founder of the Miramar Zeemuseum in Vledder, Netherlands. She took annual, solo trips all over the world to collect shells and other sea creatures for display in the museum.

== Biography ==
Warners was born Adriana Wilhelmina Warners in Leersum, Netherlands. She went by the name Jeanne for almost her entire life and, in 1935, she legally changed her name to Jeanne Adriana Wilhelmina. She trained to be a nurse, a police officer, and a psychologist.

In 1955, she took a trip to Mallorca and was impressed by a spiny dye-murex shell that she found on the beach. This sparked an interest in molluscs and inspired her to open a marine life museum. She returned to the Netherlands with bags full of shells that she started to identify with the help of C.O. van Regteren Altena, curator of molluscs at the Rijksmuseum van Natuurlijke Historie in Leiden. One year later, in 1956, she officially opened the Miramar Zeemuseum. The museum was first located in Warners's house in Oosterbeek, but when the collection outgrew the space, she moved it to a larger location in Vledder, its current location.

In June 1986, Warners became ill and was taken to a hospital in Zwolle. She died the following day. The Stichting Zeemuseum Miramar had already taken over the management of the museum in 1984.

=== Travel ===
Warners regularly traveled around the world searching for new specimens for her museum. She went on an extensive trip almost every year from 1955 until 1984. Her travels took her to more than 80 countries in nearly every part of the world, including Europe, Africa, Asia, Oceania, and the Americas. She traveled on her own, transporting all of her luggage herself in modified baby carriages.

During a stay on the island of Fernando Pó (modern day Bioko) in 1959, she was gifted a small moustached guenon monkey by her host, which she named Kabouter. She brought him back with her to the Netherlands, where he was a beloved companion. After he died five years later, Warners had him mounted and displayed in the museum.
