= Historisch Centrum Leeuwarden =

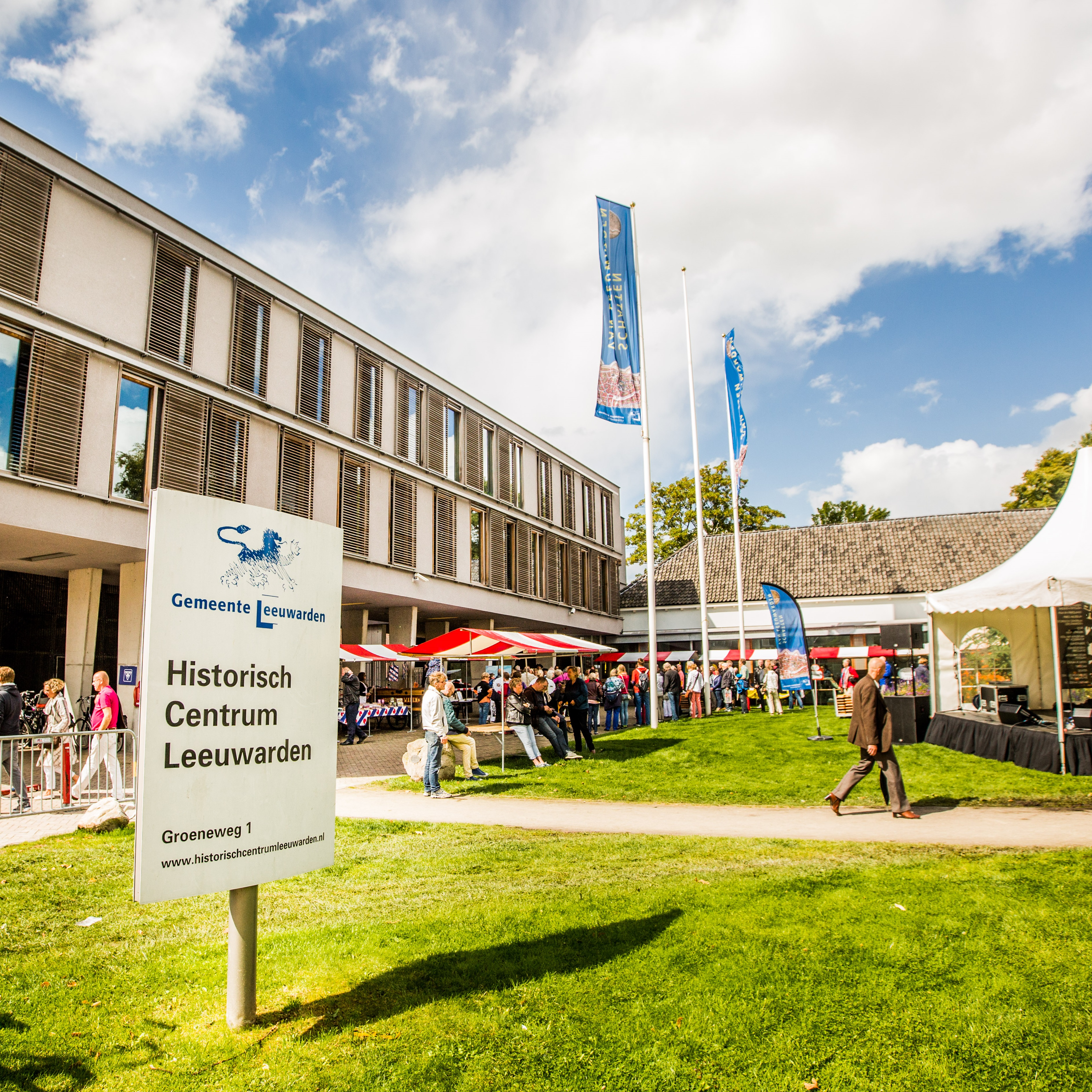
- Established: 2001
- Location: Groeneweg 1, Leeuwarden, Netherlands
- Coordinates: 53.20386°N 5.7914°E
- Type: archive
- Website: historischcentrumleeuwarden.nl/english

Historisch Centrum Leeuwarden (Historical Center Leeuwarden), located in Leeuwarden, Netherlands, preserves documents pertaining to the history of Leeuwarden.

== History ==
Leeuwarden was the first Dutch city to get an official city archive in 1838. Wopke Eekhoff was the first archivist. Historisch Centrum Leeuwarden (HCL) was established in 2001. Since 2007 it is located in a new building in the city-centre.

== Preservation ==
The main focus of Historisch Centrum Leeuwarden is preserving the municipal archives of Leeuwarden. The archives consists of hundreds of archives from the municipal government, companies, private people, families and various organisations. It also houses the largest image collection of the northern Netherlands, an extensive library with books and multimedia and a municipal art collection. The exhibition The story of Leeuwarden tells the history of the Frisian capital.

It is also custodian of Archaeological Centre Leeuwarden, the leaning tower of Oldehove and the nearby Pier Pander Museum with Temple.

== See also ==
- Tresoar
