= Abe Bonnema =

Dutch architect (1926–2001)

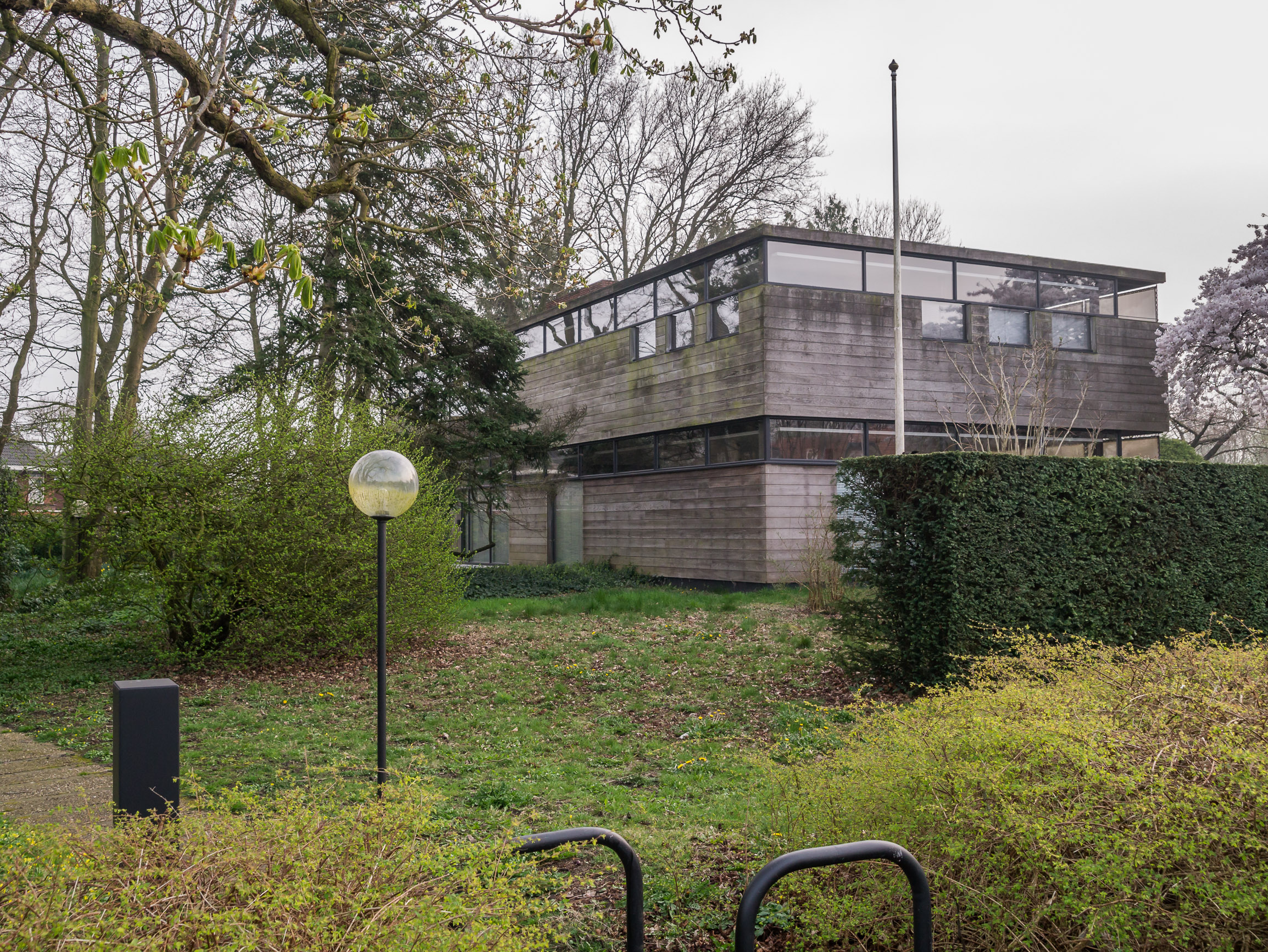
- Home of Bonnema in Hurdegaryp in 2014
- Born: Abe Bonnema; 6 September 1926; Stiens, Netherlands
- Died: 9 August 2001 (aged 74); Groningen
- Education: TU Delft
- Occupation: Architect
- Practice: Bonnema Architecten
- Buildings: Gebouw Delftse Poort in Rotterdam Achmeatoren in Leeuwarden Het Boek, Amsterdam

Abe Bonnema (6 September 1926 – 9 August 2001) was a Dutch architect.

He studied architectural engineering at the Delft University of Technology. He established his own office for architecture and spatial planning, first in Leeuwarden, then in Hurdegaryp. He was a functionalist architect. In addition to buildings for care, education and offices, Bonnema has designed more than a thousand homes in Leeuwarden.

== Selected works ==
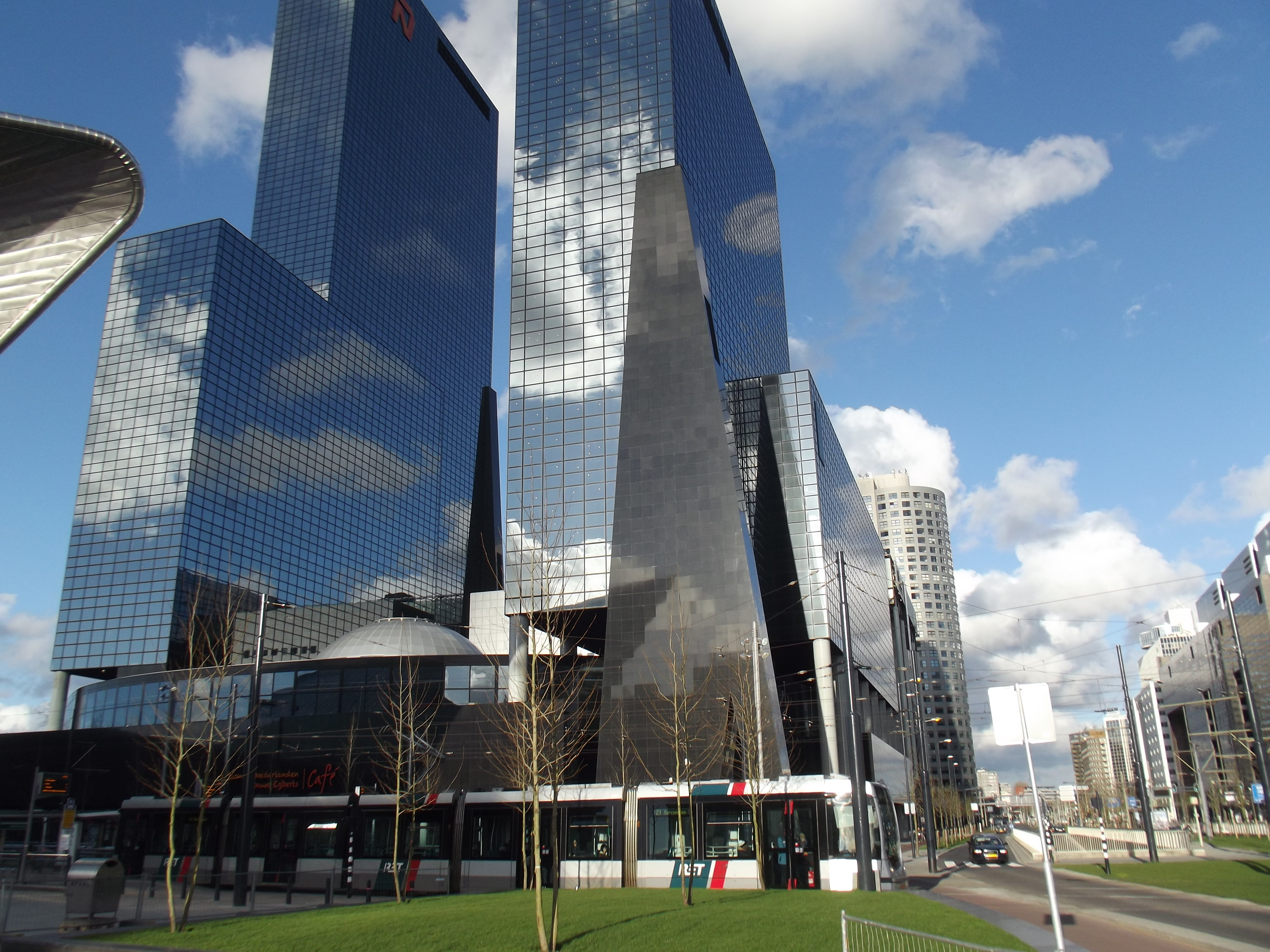
Gebouw Delftse Poort, 1991, Rotterdam

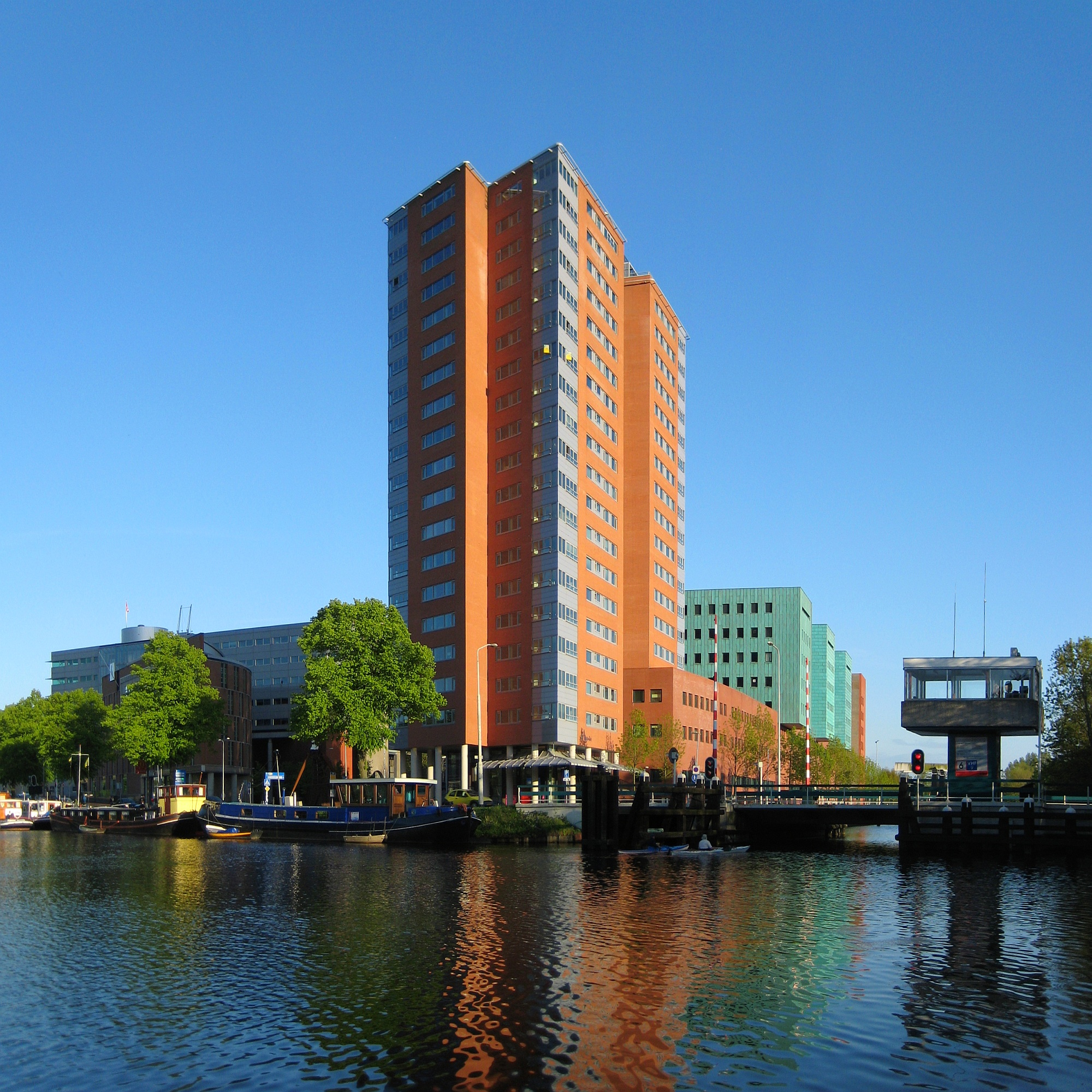
Cascadecomplex, 2000, Groningen

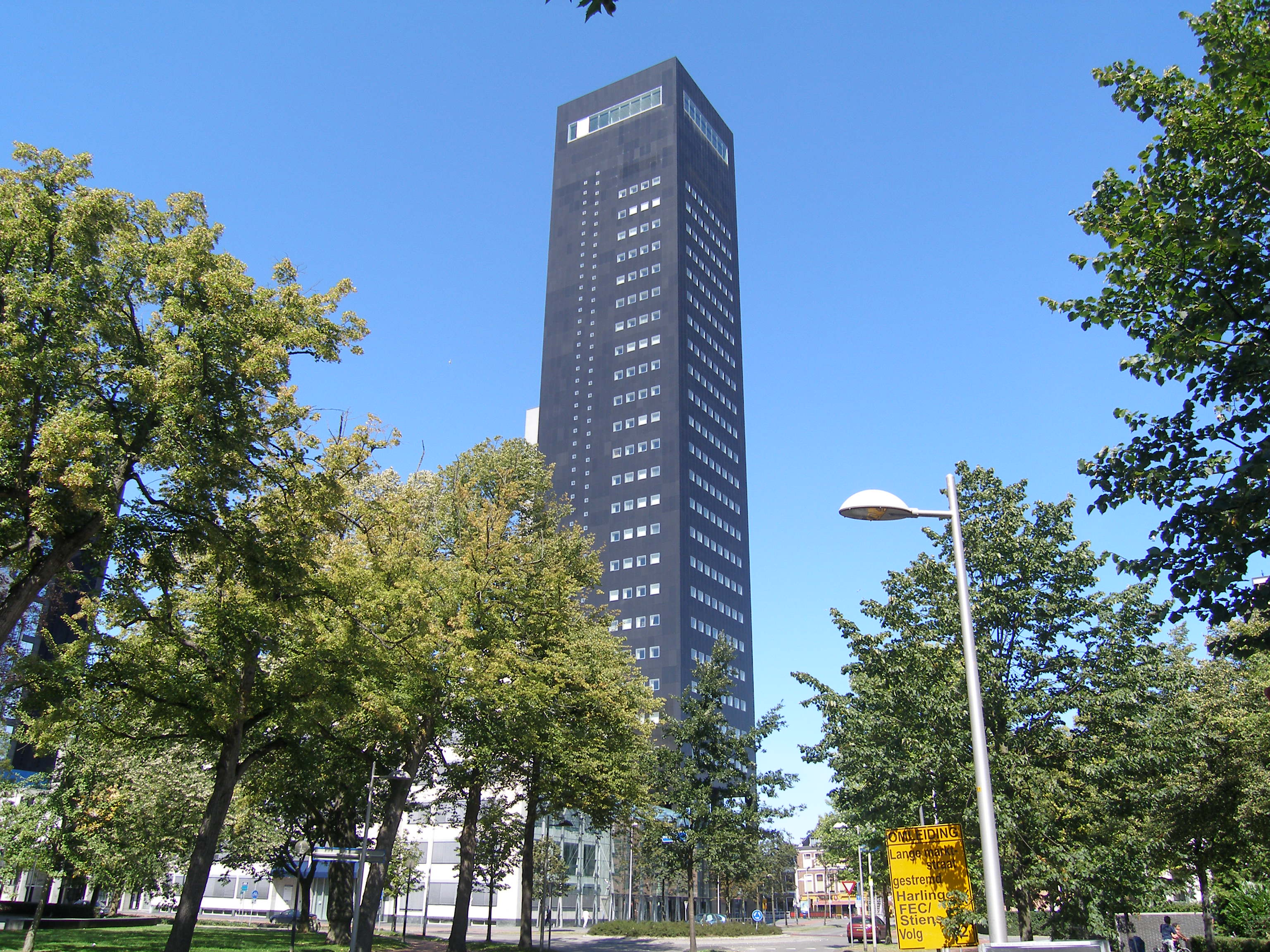
Achmeatoren, 2002, Leeuwarden

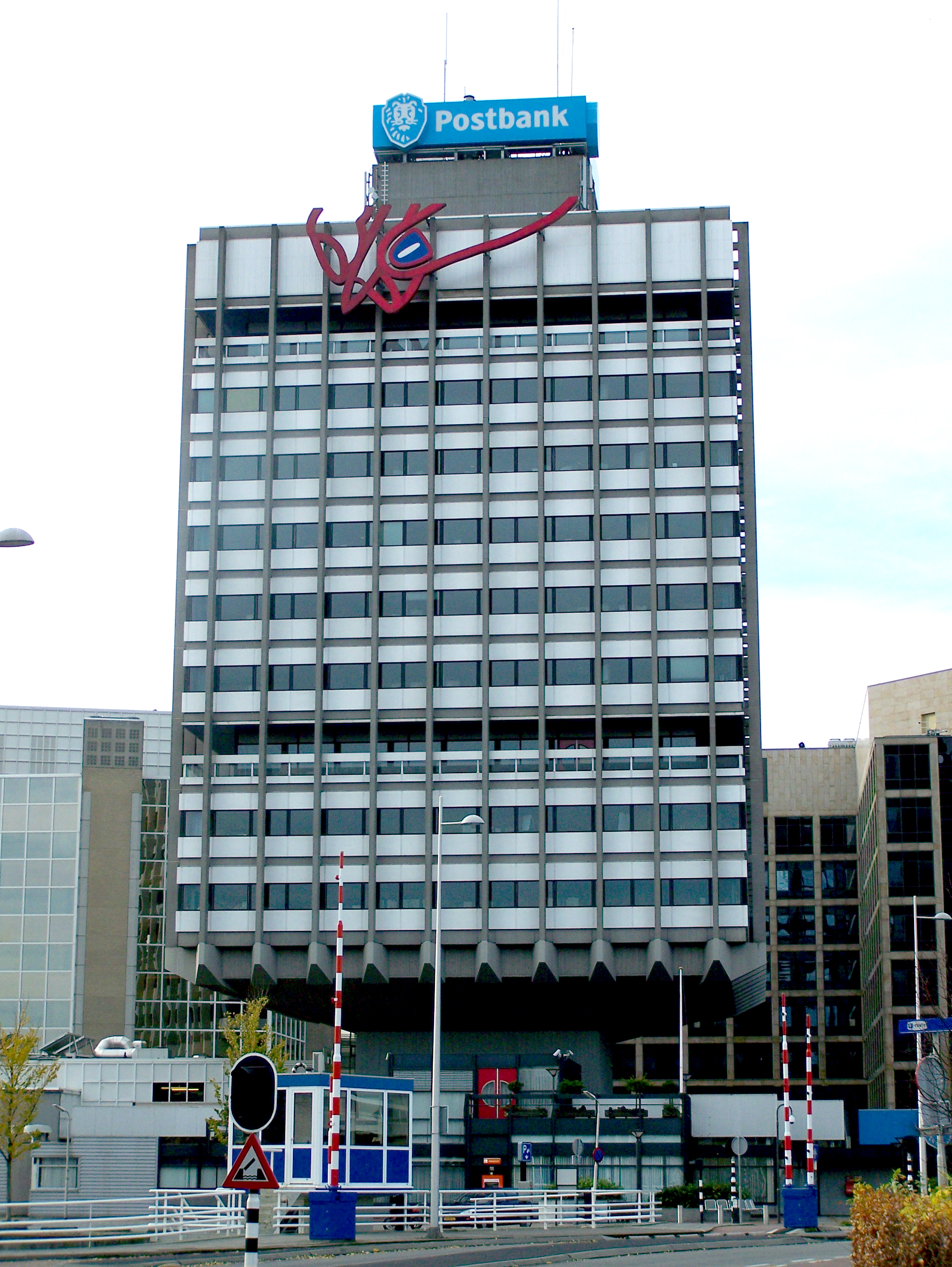
Girokantoor, Leeuwarden

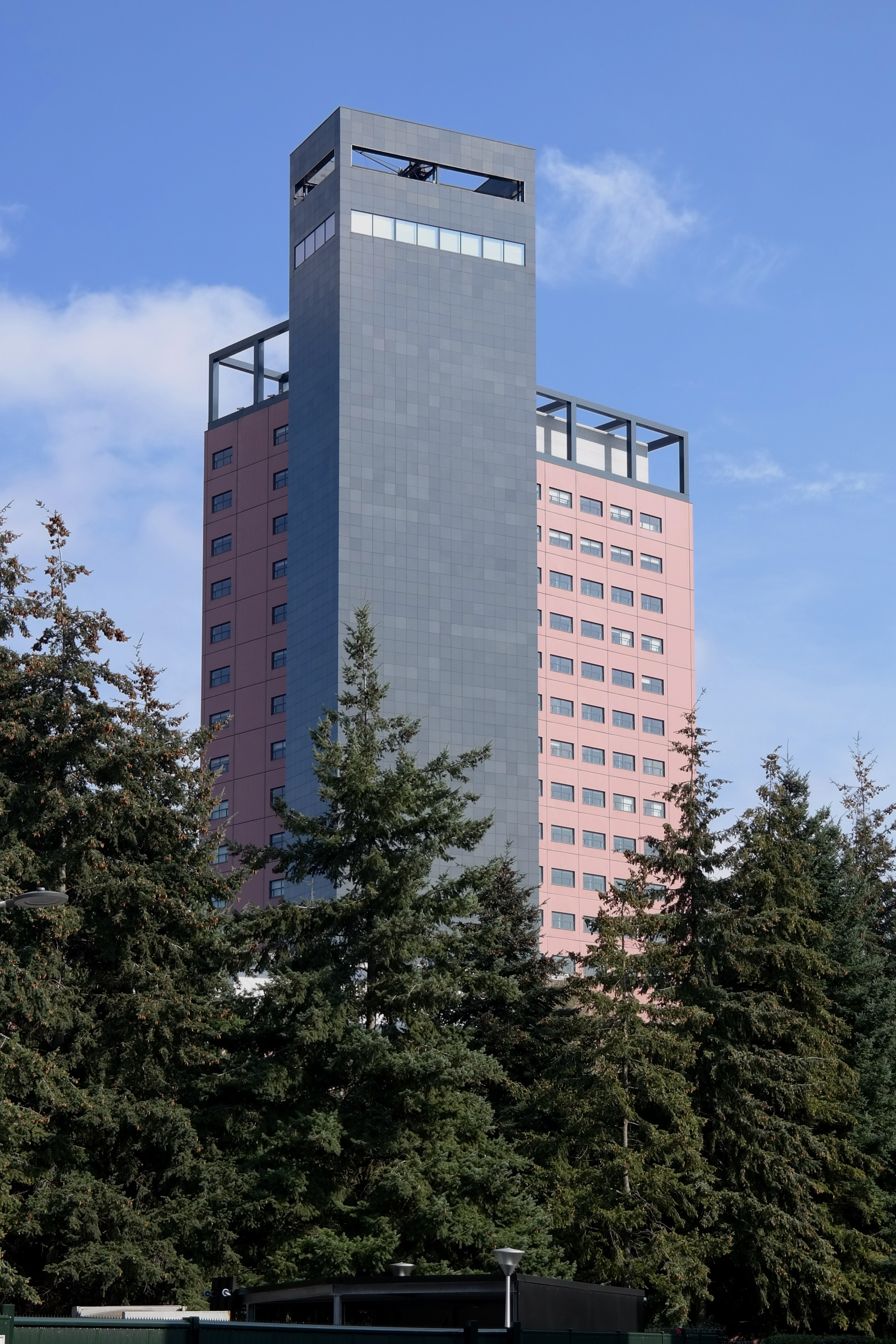
Interpolis tower, Tilburg

Exhibitions of his work took place in various museums, including Museum Boijmans Van Beuningen in Rotterdam and the Museum of Modern Art in New York.

== Legacy ==
The Abe Bonnema Foundation manages the legacy of the Frisian architect. The Foundation aims to contribute to stimulating the quality of architecture in the Netherlands by awarding the Abe Bonnema Prize. At the same time, the Foundation wishes to draw renewed attention to the ideas and oeuvre of the architect ir. Bonnema in this way.

=== Fries Museum ===
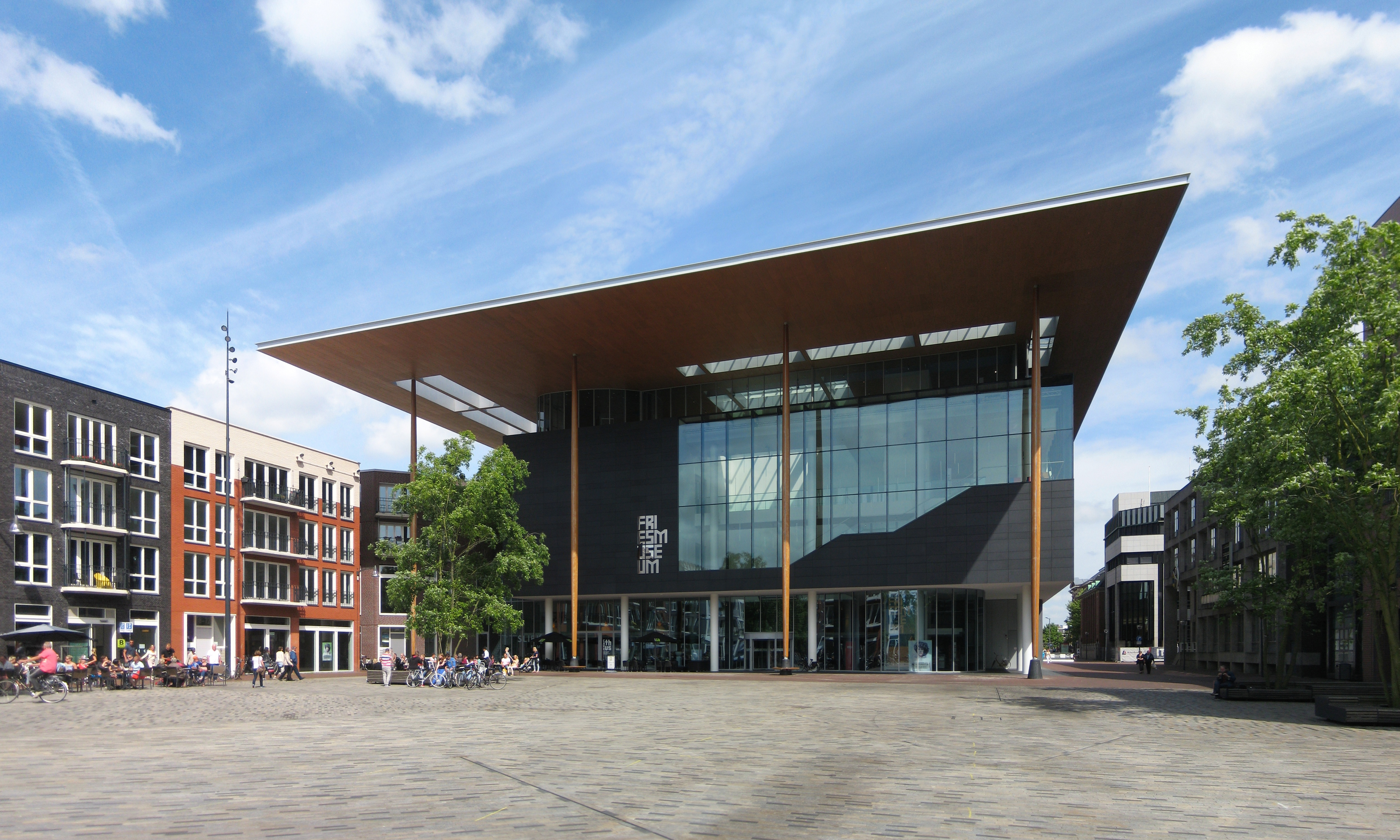
Fries Museum in Leeuwarden

Bonnema has left a legacy to the city of Leeuwarden under certain conditions (executory bequest). The money had to be spent on a new accommodation for the Fries Museum. This new museum had to be built on the Zaailand and the design had to be made by Hubert-Jan Henket in collaboration with his architectural firm Bonnema Architects. The building has been realized and was opened in 2013.

=== Abe Bonnema Prize ===
The Abe Bonnema Prize is an initiative of the Abe Bonnema Foundation. The purpose of the Abe Bonnema Prize is to focus attention on the architects of projects that are exemplary through the application of innovative concepts and aspects, set a new standard or be a model of innovation of the architecture.

== See also ==
- List of Dutch architects
