= Oldehove (tower) =

Leaning tower in Leeuwarden, Netherlands

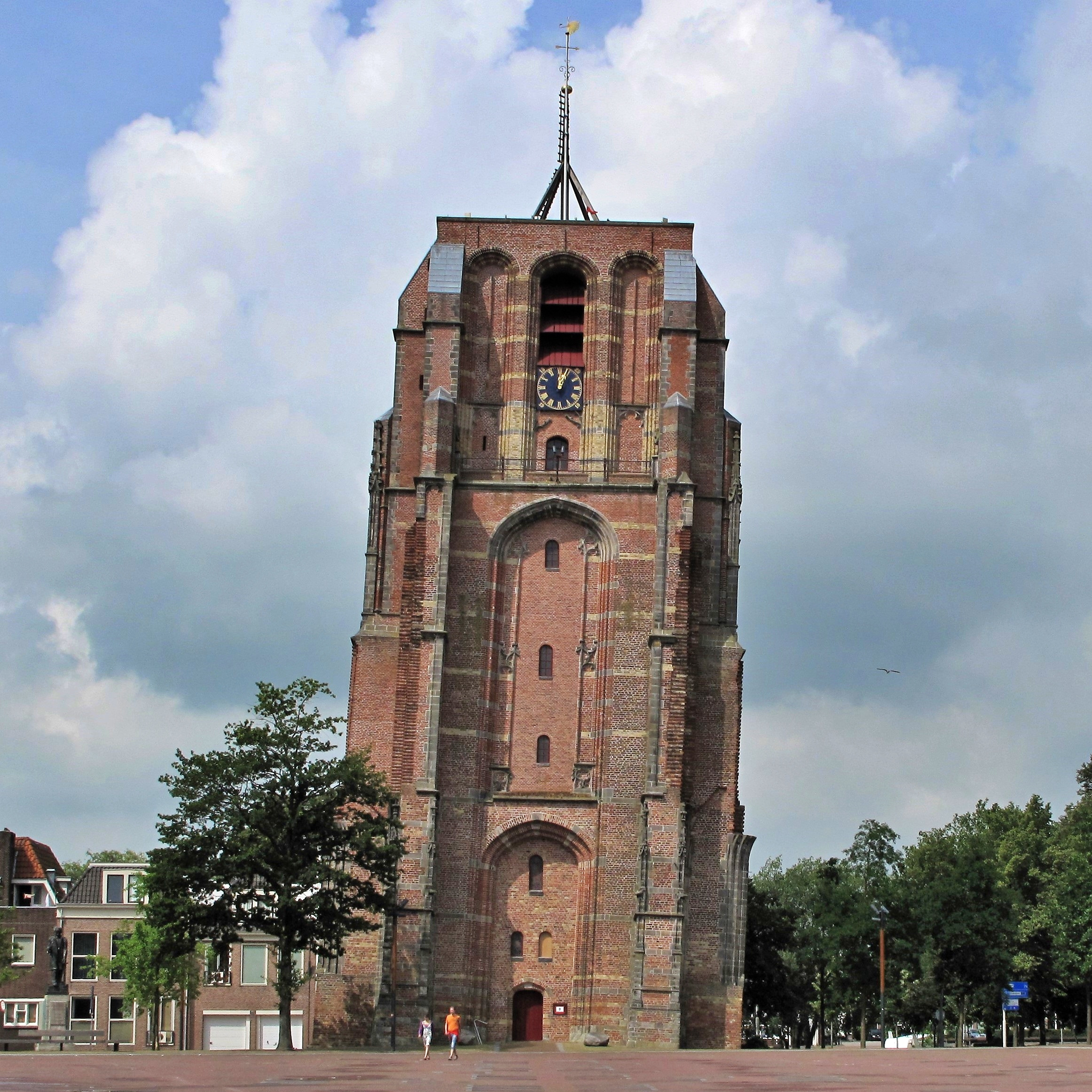
- The Oldehove in 2009

Location
- Location: Leeuwarden, Netherlands
- Interactive map of Oldehove
- Coordinates: 53°12′10.72″N 5°47′22.96″E

Architecture
- Type: Church tower
- Style: Gothic
- Groundbreaking: 1529
- Completed: 1533
- Height (max): 39 m (127.95 ft)

The Oldehove (West Frisian: Aldehou [ˈɔːdəhɔu]) is a leaning and unfinished church tower in the medieval centre of the Dutch city of Leeuwarden.

Oldehove is also the name of an artificial mound (terp) on which in the late 9th century a (Catholic) church dedicated to Saint Vitus was built. Construction of the adjoining Late Gothic tower began in 1529, after the citizens of Leeuwarden demanded a tower taller than the one in the city of Groningen, the Martinitoren. In charge were Jacob van Aken (or Aaken) and, after his death, Cornelis Frederiksz.

The tower's tilt began during construction. The builders tried to compensate for the tilt, but the project was stopped in 1532 (1533 according to another source). In 1595–1596, the then derelict church was demolished, but the tower remains. It consists mostly of brick, but the builders also used so-called Bentheim sandstone. There are two bells. A bell cast in 1633 by Hans Falck and a bell cast in 1637 by Jacob Noteman, weight 2,100 kg (4,630 lb). It is listed as a Rijksmonument, number 24331.

The height of the tower is 39 metres (127.95 feet). The tower has 183 steps. The top of the tower is displaced horizontally 2 metres (6 ft 7 in) from the centre. The original plan included attaching a new church to the tower, which would replace the old saint vitus church, but this was never realized. Custodian of the tower is Historisch Centrum Leeuwarden.

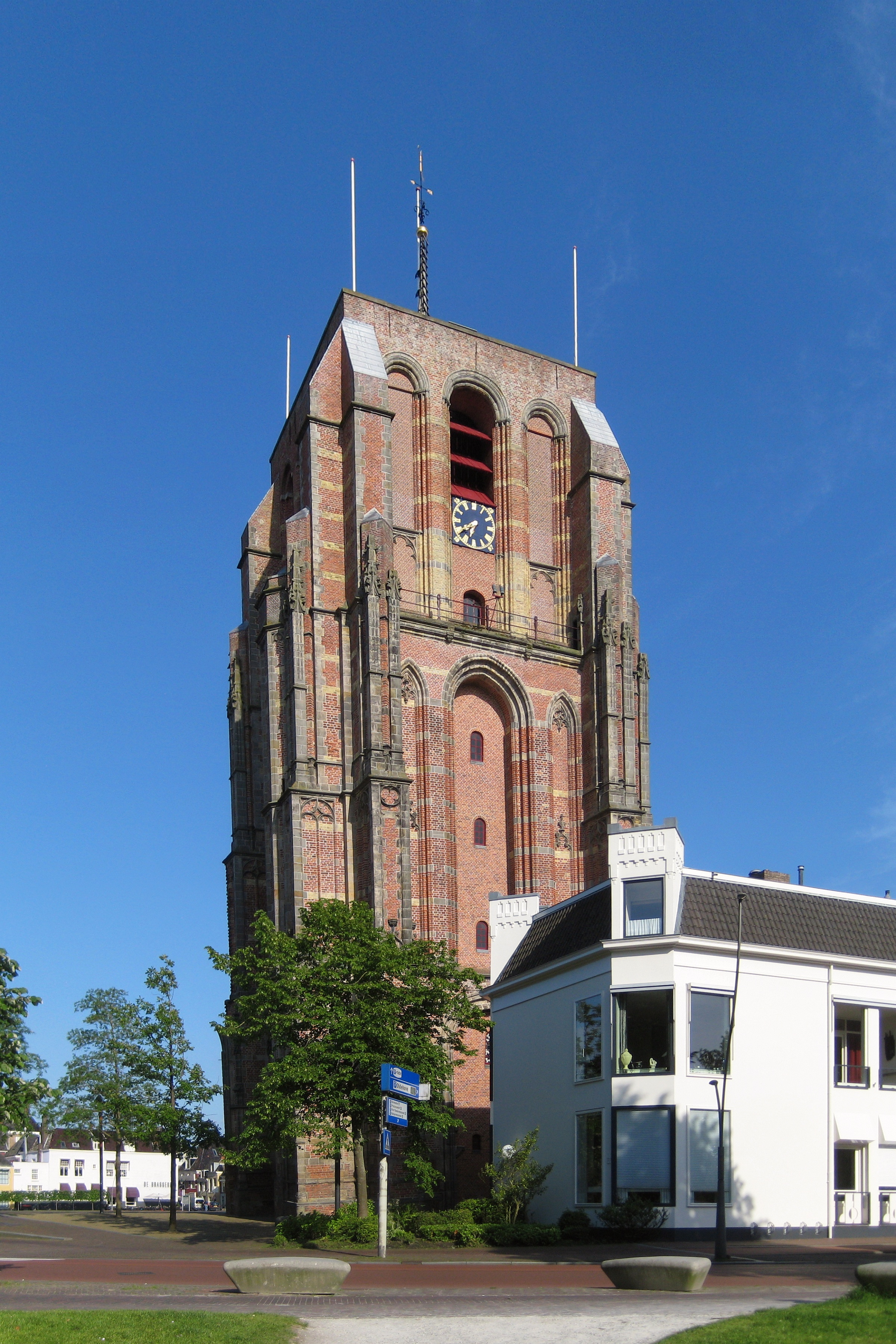
Westside of the Oldehove in 2014

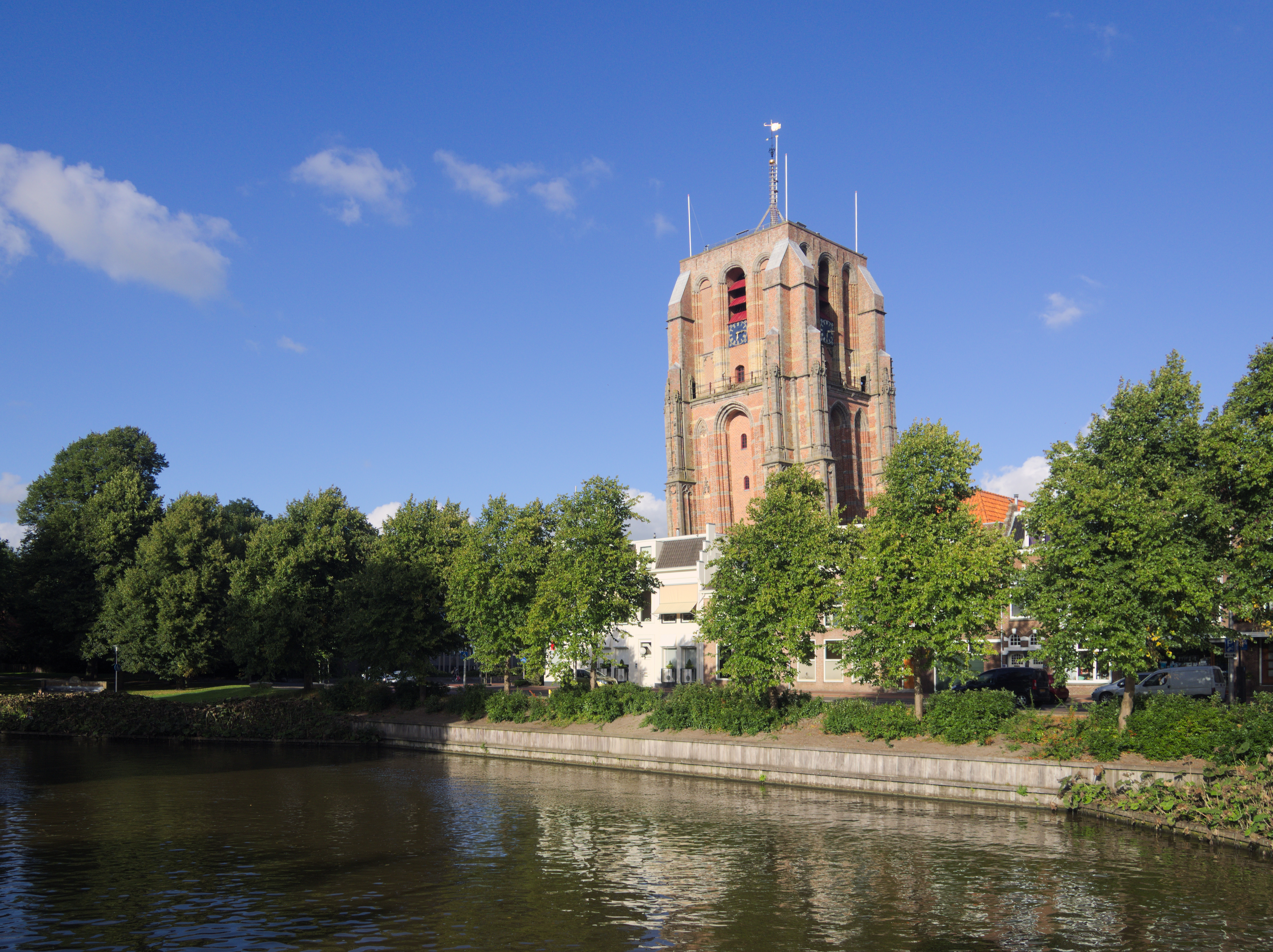
The Oldehove from the southwest

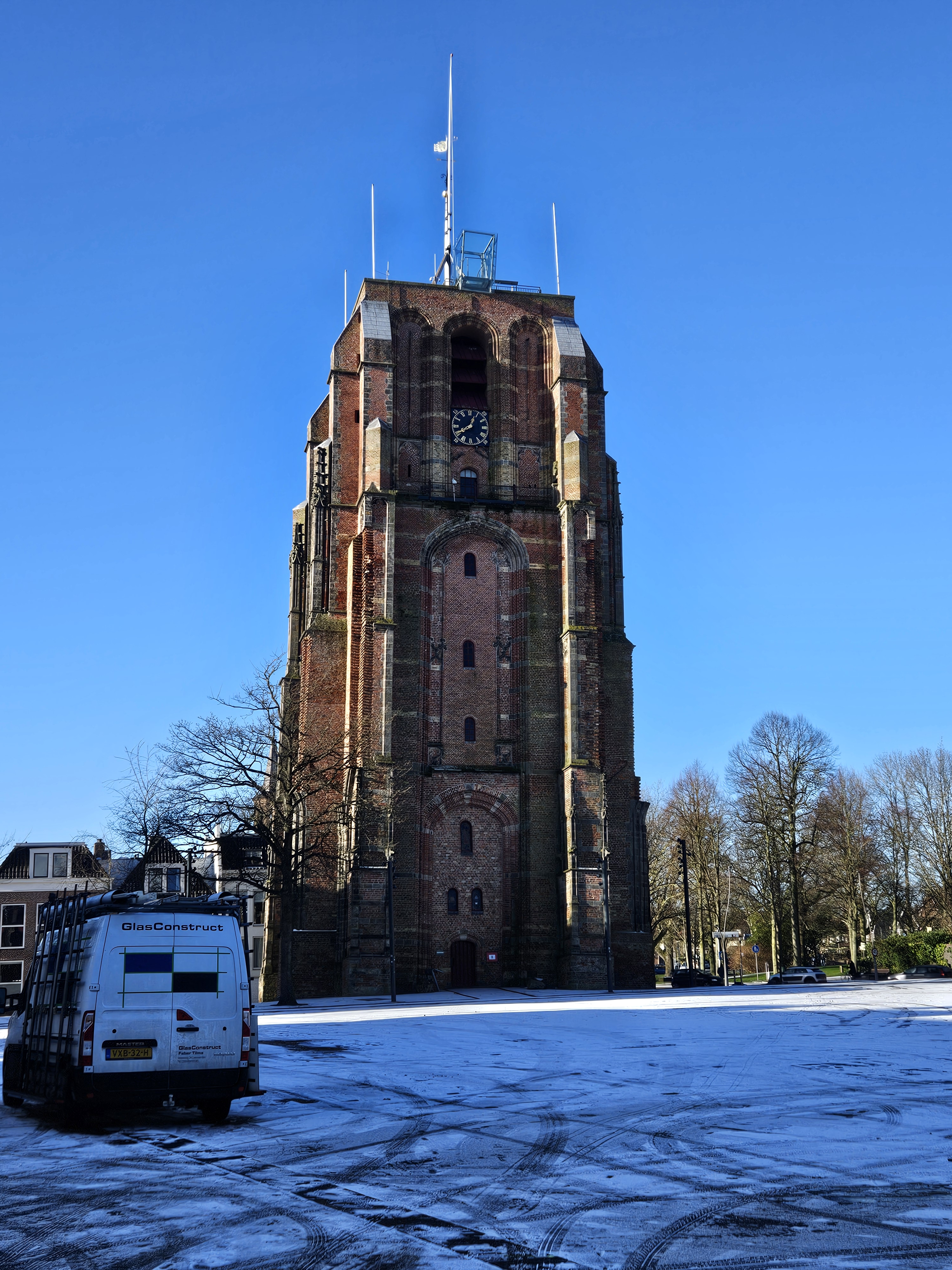
Oldehove in winter 2024

== Sources ==
- Stenvert, R. et al. (2000). Monumenten in Nederland: Fryslân, p. 25, 41 and 189–196. Waanders Uitgevers, Zwolle, the Netherlands. ISBN 90-400-9476-4.
