= Allert Warners =

Dutch architect (1914–1980)

- Born: 3 January 1914; Amsterdam
- Died: 18 June 1980 (aged 66)
- Occupation: Architect
- Buildings: De Verfdos, Warnersblokken

Allert Warners (3 January 1914 – 18 June 1980) was a twentieth-century Dutch architect from Amsterdam. He was the son of the architect F.A. Warners.

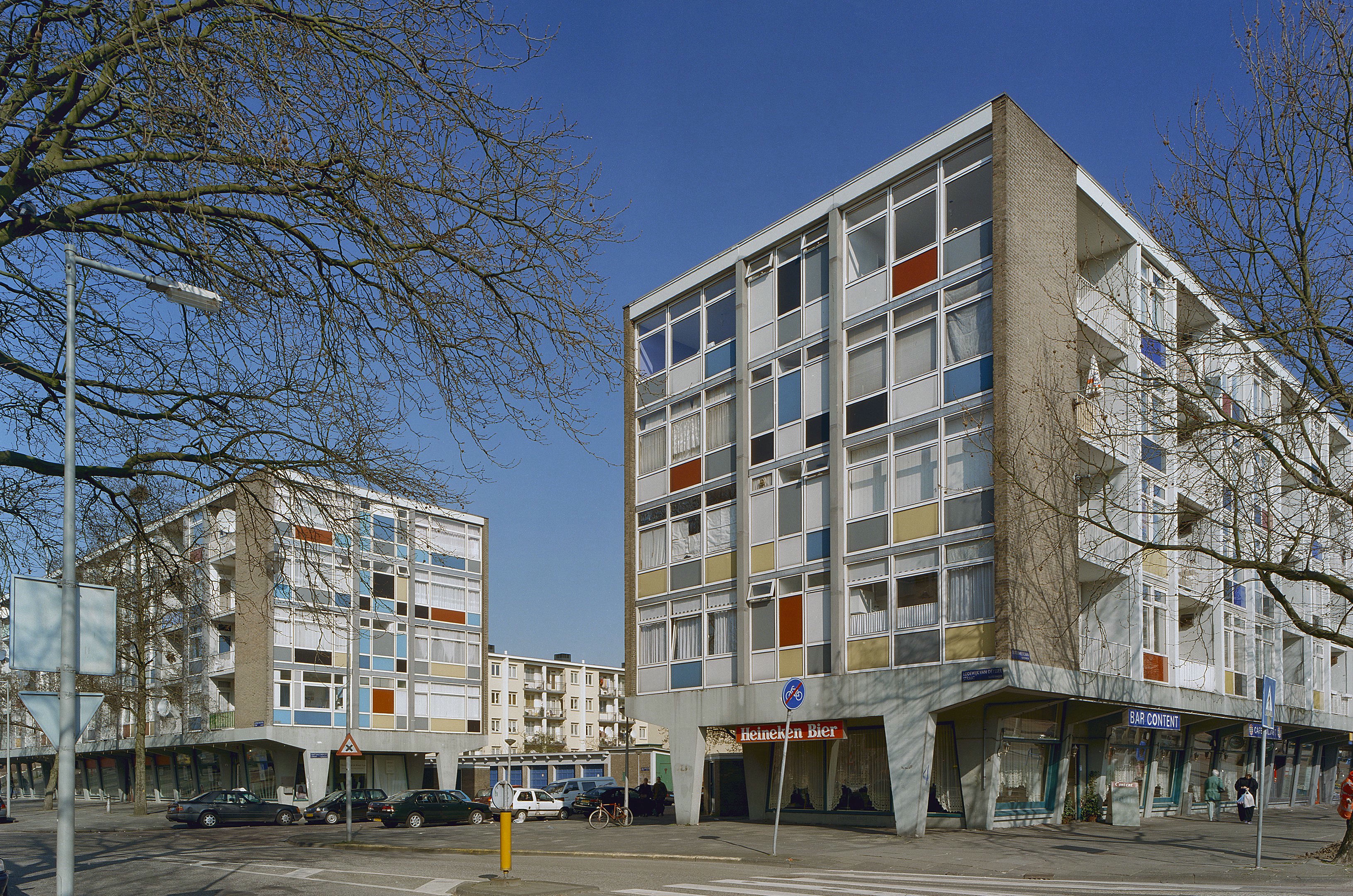
Striking buildings on the Slotermeerlaan include the large and small 'Verfdoos' ('Paintbox'). This photo of 2002 shows the colours before the 2009 renovation.

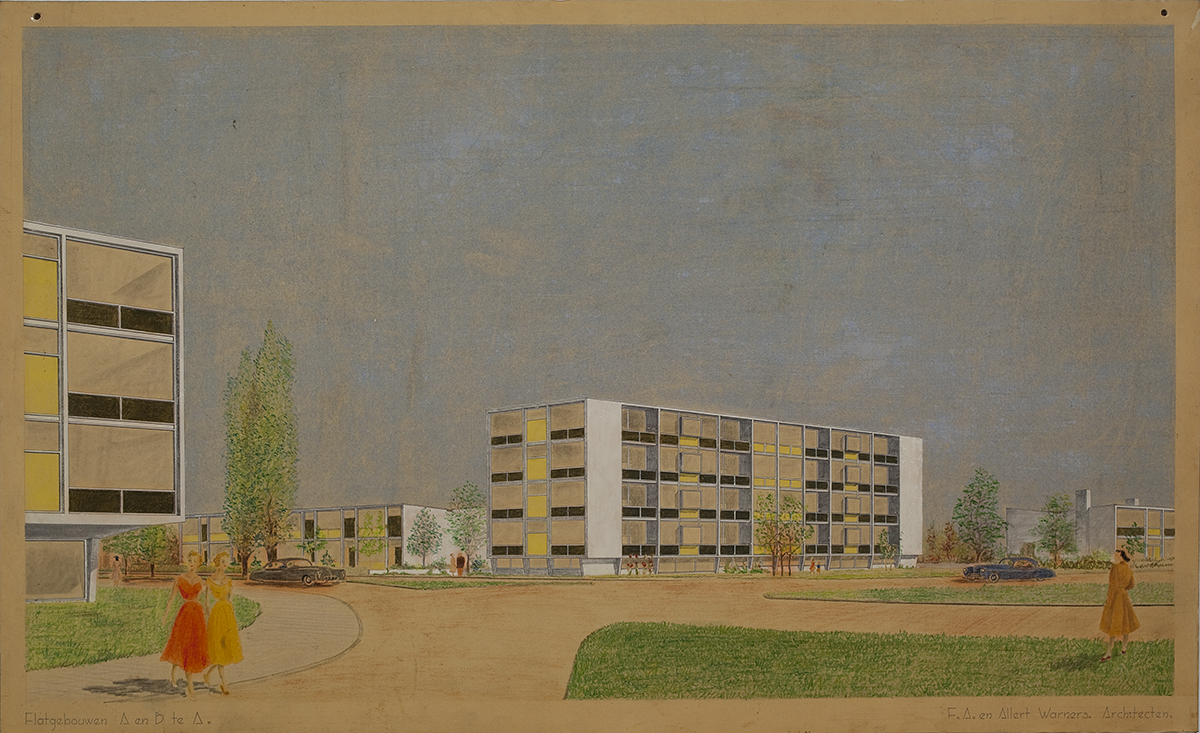
Ontwerptekening voor de grote en de kleine 'Verfdoos', twee woongebouwen in Slotermeer.

After attaining his mts-diploma, Warner undertook his Hbo in Amsterdam, between 1936 and 1943. Three years later he did a one-year course at the Academy of Stockholm. At the same time as starting with his Hbo, he worked as a draughtsman in his father's architectural firm. He would take over the firm after his father's death in 1952.

Two of Warner's most renowned buildings are the large and small 'Paintbox' (nl: Verfdos); two residential buildings in the Slotermeer area of Amsterdam. At the time of their opening in 1956, the buildings created much interest nationally and internationally; more than 10,000 visitors came to see the buildings. Of particular interest was the colour scheme and deployment on the facade (designed by the Belgian artist Joseph Ongenae) and with long living rooms with windows at both ends that allowed sun to shine in the morning and afternoon.

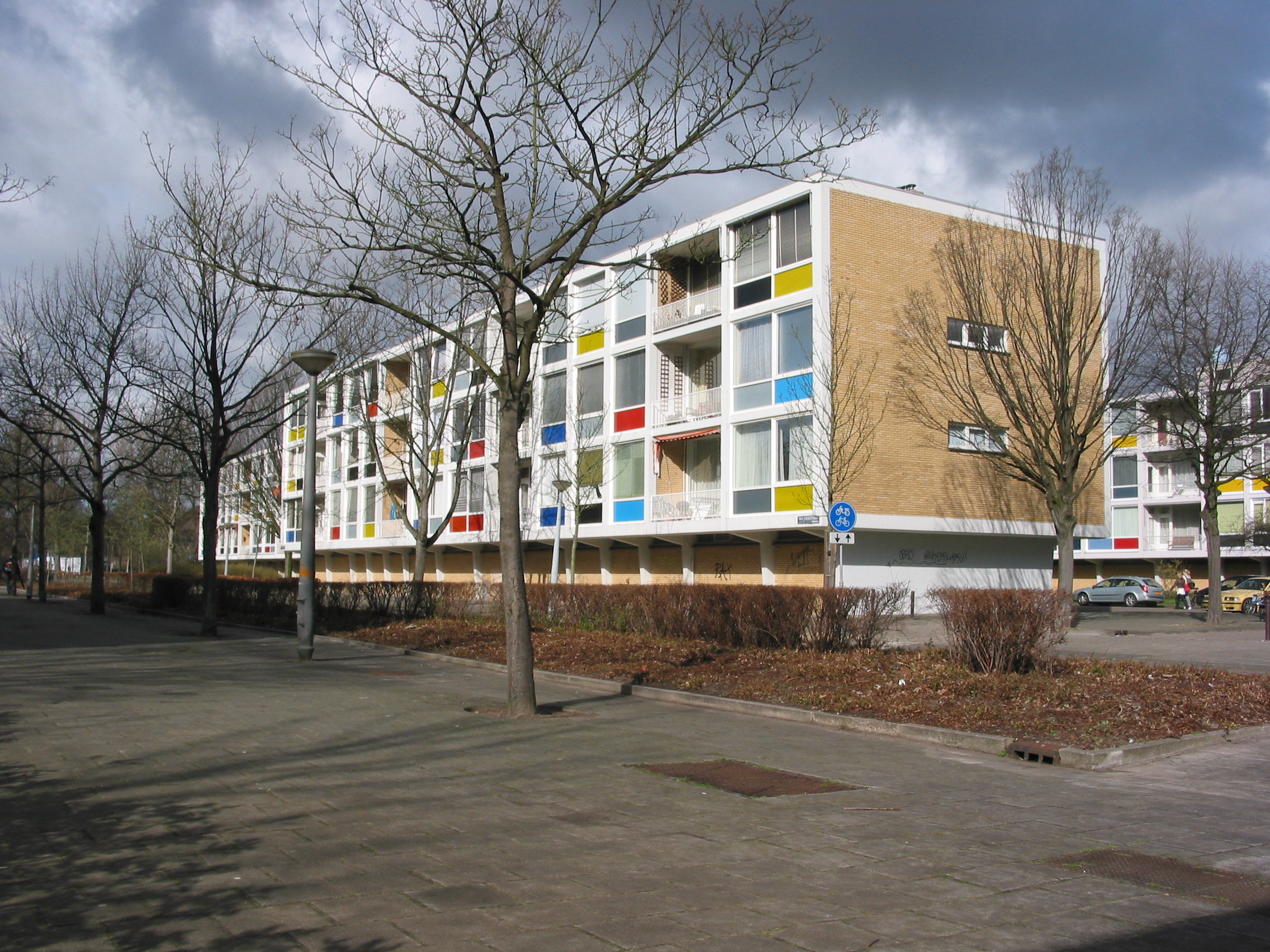
One of the Warnersblokken on the Fred. Roeskestraat in Amsterdam-Zuid

A year later, four comparable buildings were built in Amsterdam-Zuid, with garages (instead of shops) on the ground floor. The buildings (named Warnersblokken after their architect) are now designated national monuments in the Netherlands.
