= Vera Spencer =

British artist (1926–2021)

- Born: 1926; Prague, Czechoslovakia
- Died: 14 January 2021 (aged 94); London, United Kingdom
- Education: Slade School of Fine Art, Central School of Arts and Crafts
- Occupation(s): painter, designer
- Movement: Constructivism, Modernism

Vera Spencer (1926 – 14 January 2021) was a British painter and textile designer, whose work has been described as constructivist and modernist. Her work is exhibited and preserved in several public collections, including the Arts Council, the Tate gallery. Art historian Herta Wescher was a keen collector of her work.

== Biography ==
Vera Spencer was born in Prague, Czechoslovakia in 1926 but moved with her family to the United Kingdom in 1936. She attended the Slade School of Fine Art and the Central School of Arts and Crafts between 1946 and 1949. She married the British designer Herbert Spencer, who founded the journal of typography Typographica in 1949 and taught typography at the Central School from 1949 to 1955.

Spencer was one of the new, progressive abstract artists and contributed to many groundbreaking exhibitions from the early 1950s. She was associated with several artistic groups at the time, including the Constructionists, the Independent Group, and the Modern Movement.

Her friendship with Paule Vézelay and links with Groupe Espace in Paris led to her joining the English branch, where she participated in their inaugural exhibition at the Royal Festival Hall in 1955.

Vera Spencer died in west London on 14 January 2021, aged 94.

Alastair Grieve mentions Saunders in his 2005 book "Constructed Abstract Art in England After the Second World War: A Neglected Avant-Garde". She is also named in art historian Alan Fowler's 2006 PhD thesis "Constructive Art in Britain 1913 – 2005".

== Exhibitions ==
=== Solo ===
1948	Galerie Apollinaire, Paris
1952	Galerie Arnaud, Paris
1953	(with Terence Conran), 22 Piccadilly Arcade
1968	Elizabeth Gallery, Coventry

=== Group ===
1951	Abstract Paintings, Sculptures, Mobiles, A.I.A. Gallery, London
	Aspects of British Art, Gimpel Fils Gallery
1952	Trois Peintres, Paris/A.I.A. Gallery
	The Mirror and Square, A.I.A. Gallery
1953	Third Weekend Exhibition, 22 Fitzroy Street, London
1954	Collages and Objects, ICA, London
	Artist v. Machine, Building Centre, Store Street, London
1955	First exhibition of the Groupe Espace of Great Britain, Royal Festival Hall, London
1956	International Collages Exhibition, Rose Fried Gallery, New York
1964	Cinquante ans de collages; papier colles, assemblages, collages, du Cubisme a nos jours, Musée d'Art et d'Industrie de Saint-Étienne, France
1992	British Abstract Art, Belgrave Gallery, London

== Works in Public Collections ==
- Arts Council Collection London
- Tate Britain
