= Richard Eckersley =

Richard Eckersley may refer to:

- Richard Eckersley (designer) (1941-2006), British graphic designer
- Richard Eckersley (footballer) (born 1989), English footballer
