= The Penrose Annual =

UK graphic arts review, 1895–1982

The Penrose Annual was a London-based review of graphic arts, printed nearly annually from 1895 to 1982.

Penrose began in 1895 as Process Work Yearbook – Penrose's Annual. Lund Humphries has printed the publication since 1897 and has been responsible for its content from 1906 until selling Penrose to Northwood Publications Limited, part of the Thompson Corporation, in 1974. It was edited by William Gamble from 1895 to 1933 then Richard Bertram Fishenden from 1934 to 1957. Fishenden's friend Allan Delafons then took over as editor from the delayed 1958 volume number 52 until the 1962 volume number 56. There was no Penrose annual for 1963 and it re-appeared in 1964 with a new editor, Herbert Spencer, who continued until the 66th volume in 1973, when the title was sold to Northwood. Bryan Smith then edited two volumes before handing over to Penrose's final editor, Clive Goodacre (initially assisted by Stanley Greenwood). Goodacre edited Penrose until Northwood closed the publication down in 1982 - the last volume is number 74. James Moran compiled a special: 'Printing in the 20th Century - a Penrose Anthology' for Northwood in 1974, citing 34 previously published articles and their impact on the progression of print media technologies. Penrose Annuals remain the quintessential record for the development of mass media, advertising, photography, design and typography throughout the 20th century; from the earliest incursions by radio, through to television and, in the latter volumes, references to electronic transmission of information that has given us the internet.

Lund Humphries adoption of Monotype technology in 1906 influenced the production of Penrose: “It soon became a policy to try out each of Monotype's new types in Penrose.”

The 1938 edition was notable for its text and binding designed by Jan Tschichold. Articles in issues from that era were authored by Beatrice Warde, Stanley Morison, László Moholy-Nagy, Nikolaus Pevsner and other leading design writers. Allan Delafons edited Penrose from 1958 through 1962. Lund Humphries then had Typographica editor Herbert Spencer edit the annual from 1964 through 1973. Spencer's modernist impact on the Penrose was immediate: his first cover is printed with a stark gothic sans serif at roughly a 40° angle to the spine. Penrose's content was significant in bridging technical aspects of printing and artistic aspects of design. According to St Bride librarian Nigel Roche, “Its importance then was largely as a link between disparate areas of the trade. Its importance today is in the seminal articles that it published that still have reference value: monographs on individuals; articles on various matters of typesetting.”

The publication was most substantial (in size and influence) in the 1950s and 1960s.

== Annuals and years ==
- Annuals 1-7 were published annually and correlate to the years 1895 - 1901
- Annuals 8–21 were published annually and correlate with the years 1902/3–1916.
- Annuals 22–42 were published annually and correlate with the years 1920–1940.
- Annuals 43–56 were published annually and correlate with the years 1949–1962.
- Annuals 57–69 were published annually and correlate with the years 1964–1976.
- Annuals 70–74 were published annually and correlate with the years 1978–1982.

== See also ==
- Richard Eckersley
- Stanley Morison
- Jan Tschichold
