= Rijksakademie van beeldende kunsten =

Art academy in Amsterdam, Netherlands

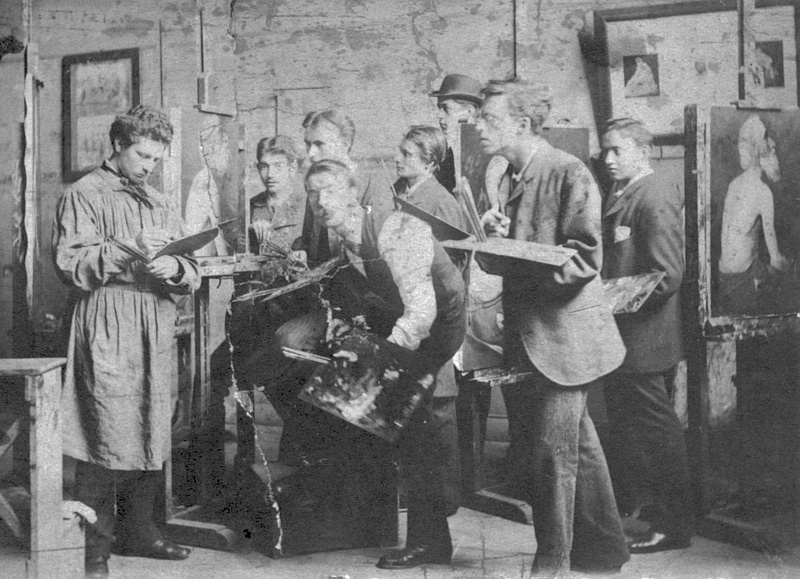
- Students in 1882
- Type: art academy
- Location: Amsterdam, Netherlands
- Website: www.rijksakademie.nl

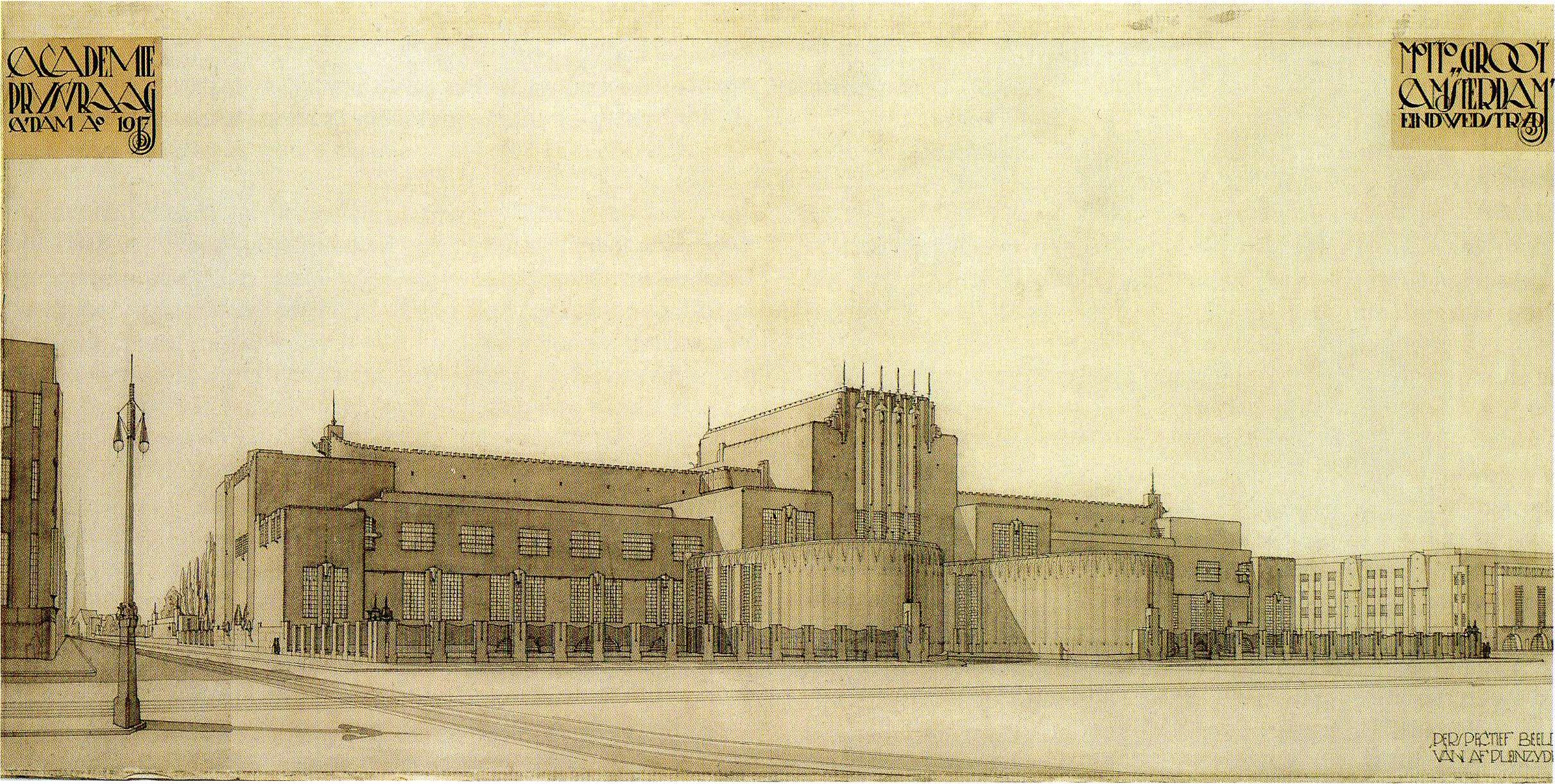
Michel de Klerk's 1918 competition design for the Rijksakademie van beeldende kunsten

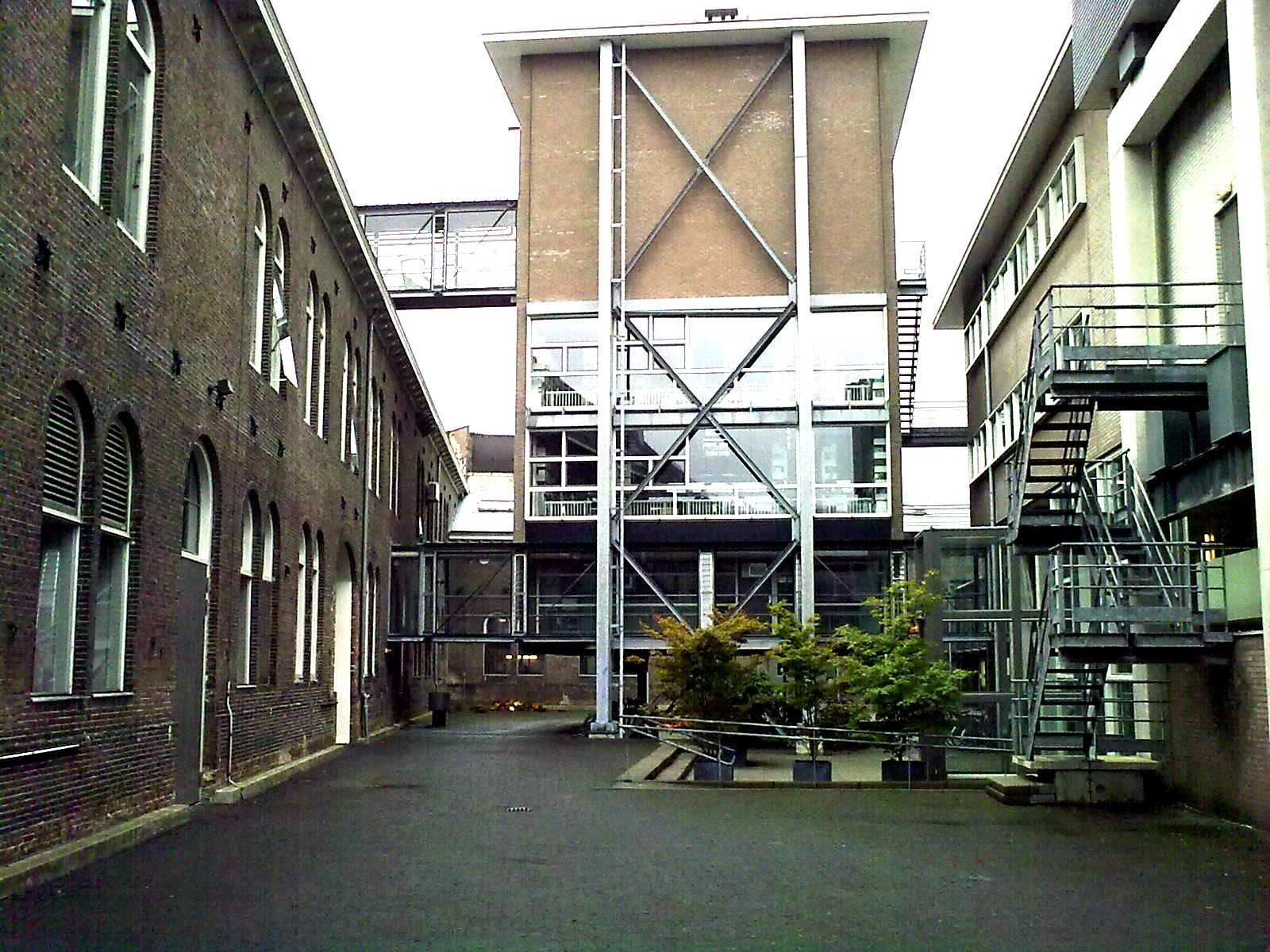
Courtyard

The Rijksakademie van beeldende kunsten ('State Academy of Fine Arts') (Note: In French, the school was called "l'Académie Royale des Beaux Arts d'Amsterdam".) was founded in 1870 in Amsterdam. It is a classical academy, a place where philosophers, academics and artists meet to test and exchange ideas and knowledge. The school supports visual artists with a two-year curriculum.

The Rijksakademie van beeldende kunsten was the home of Amsterdam Impressionism, part of the international impressionist movement, and is known as the School of Allebé by art historians; August Allebé became the school's director in 1880. Among its pioneers here were George Breitner, Jan Toorop, Piet Mondrian, Jacques Witjens, and Willem Witsen. Other artists connected with the academy were H. P. Berlage, Willem Wiegmans, Constant Nieuwenhuys, Karel Appel, Corneille, Ger Lataster, Willem Hofhuizen, and Jaap Min.

The school provides an education academically comparable with a university. There are open days each year, which provide an opportunity to see the work of young artists.

== 1718 to 1869 ==
From 1718 to 1819 Amsterdam had an art school, the Stadstekenacademie. In 1820, the Koninklijke Academie van Beeldende Kunsten continued the artistic tradition. (Note: Its rival was the Royal Academy of Art, The Hague. This academy, founded in 1682 as a night school for painting and drawing, had club evenings on Saturdays. From 1820 to about 1830, Amsterdam and The Hague struggled for supremacy in the art world of the Netherlands. The merger with the engineering school gave The Hague an advantage.) The prevailing style was panel painting in oil, landscape painting influenced by neoclassicism. In 1869, the Amsterdam school received its present name.

== Early history ==
The academy was a place for philosophers, scientists and artists to come together and share knowledge and ideas. In 1870, the academy was founded by King William III as a successor to the 19th-century Koninklijke Academie, the 18th-century Stads Teekenacademie and the 17th-century Konstkamer to give visual artists an educational opportunity. Early students included George Hendrik Breitner, Isaac Israëls and Willem Witsen, who were influenced by Amsterdam Impressionism.

Under director August Allebé, the Saint Luke (patron saint of artists) student movement was founded. (Note: The circle of friends became an association of artists on the Amsterdam art scene.) Allebé's cosmopolitan attitude changed the school's method of instruction, emphasising the avant-garde.

== Present day ==
Around 1985, the school received the additional title of Instituut voor Praktijkstudie and offered postdoctoral education. In 1992 it moved into a former cavalry barracks at Sarphatistraat 470 in Amsterdam, and the buildings were renovated. In November 1999, it became an independent art institution. The school is financed by the Ministry of Education and private sponsors. (Note: This revived the system of finance used in the Netherlands during the 19th century: first, private sponsors provide funding and the state intervenes if this is unsuccessful.) The institute offers workshops with specialised technical personnel and a library focusing on contemporary art and art history. Students receive a scholarship and are offered a studio in which to live. In recent years nearly 1,200 students have applied for a place at the academy, and each year about 20 are accepted. The artists come from all over the world, with less than half from the Netherlands. Artists and art critics are often invited to visit student studios.

== Prix de Rome ==
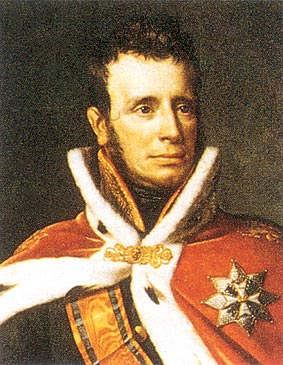
William I, King of the Netherlands, continued the Prix de Rome.

The academy awards a Prix de Rome to eligible artists and architects. The award originated with the French Prix de Rome in 1666. In 1808 Louis Bonaparte introduced the prize in the Netherlands to promote art, and it was supported by Dutch King William I. Since 1870 the Rijksakademie has made the award, the oldest and most valuable art prize in the Netherlands.

In 1985, the Prix de Rome was reorganised. Prize money was increased, and there were more participating artists; new art categories were added, which change annually. In 2006 its name was changed to "Prix de Rome.nl" and it is awarded in two categories: architecture and fine arts. The prize is €40,000 and a residency in Rome.

== Faculty ==
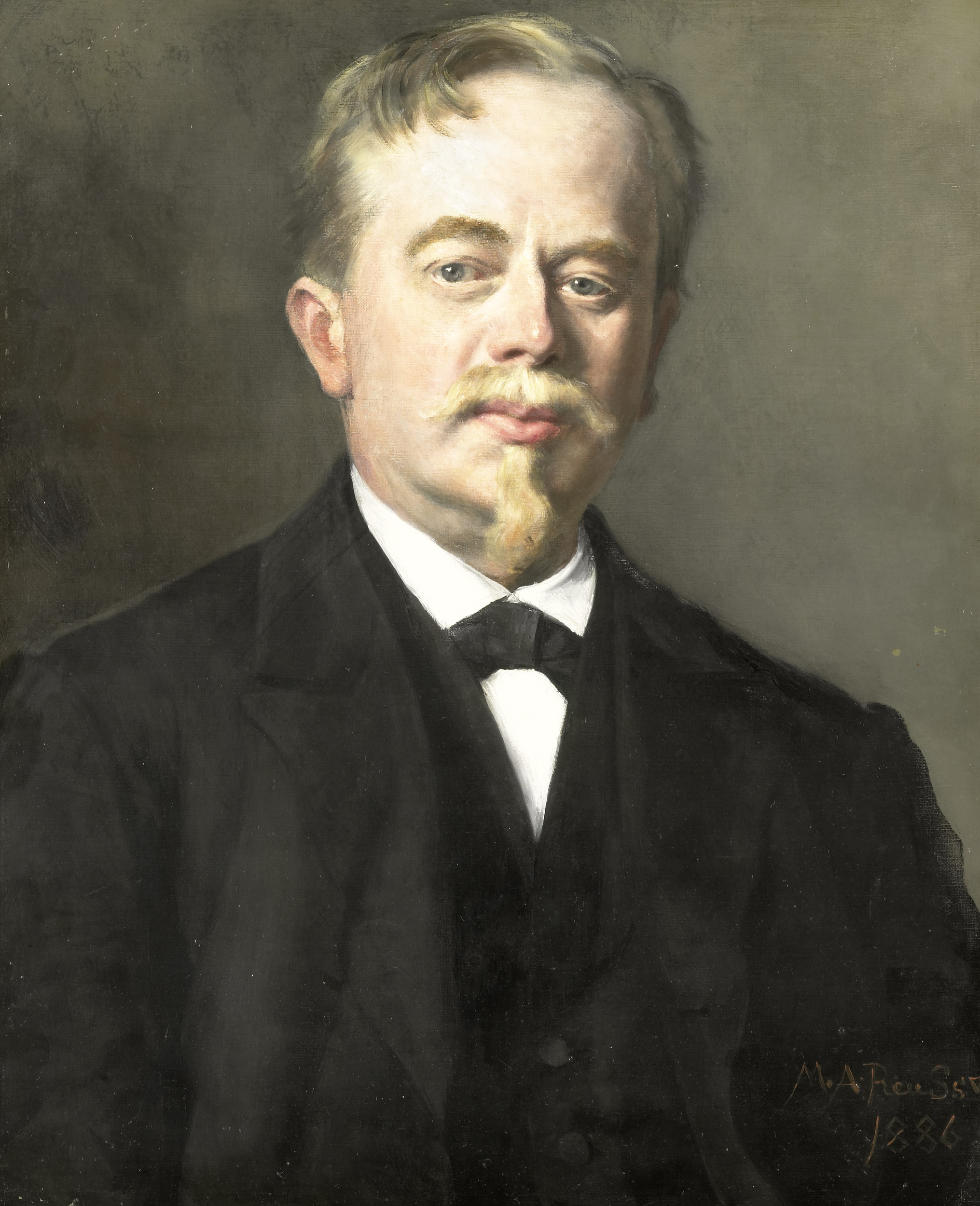
Portrait of August Allebé by Princess Marie Alexandrine of Saxe-Weimar-Eisenach

- Hans Aarsman (born 1951)
- August Allebé (1838–1927), professor in 1870, director 1880–1906
- Nico Bakker (1967–1969)
- Pierre Cuypers (1827–1921)
- Carel Ludewijk Dake (1857–1918)
- Antoon Derkinderen (1859–1925), director after Allebé
- Marinus Heijl (1835–1931)
- Richard Roland Holst (1868–1931), director after Derkinderen
- Johannes Hendricus Jurres (1875–1946)
- Petrus Josephus Lutgers (1808–1874)
- Georg Sturm (1855–1923)
- Charles Verlat (1824–1890)
- Nicolaas van der Waay (1855–1936)
- Gerhard Westermann (1880–1971)
- Petrus van Wijnveld (1820–1902)

== Students ==
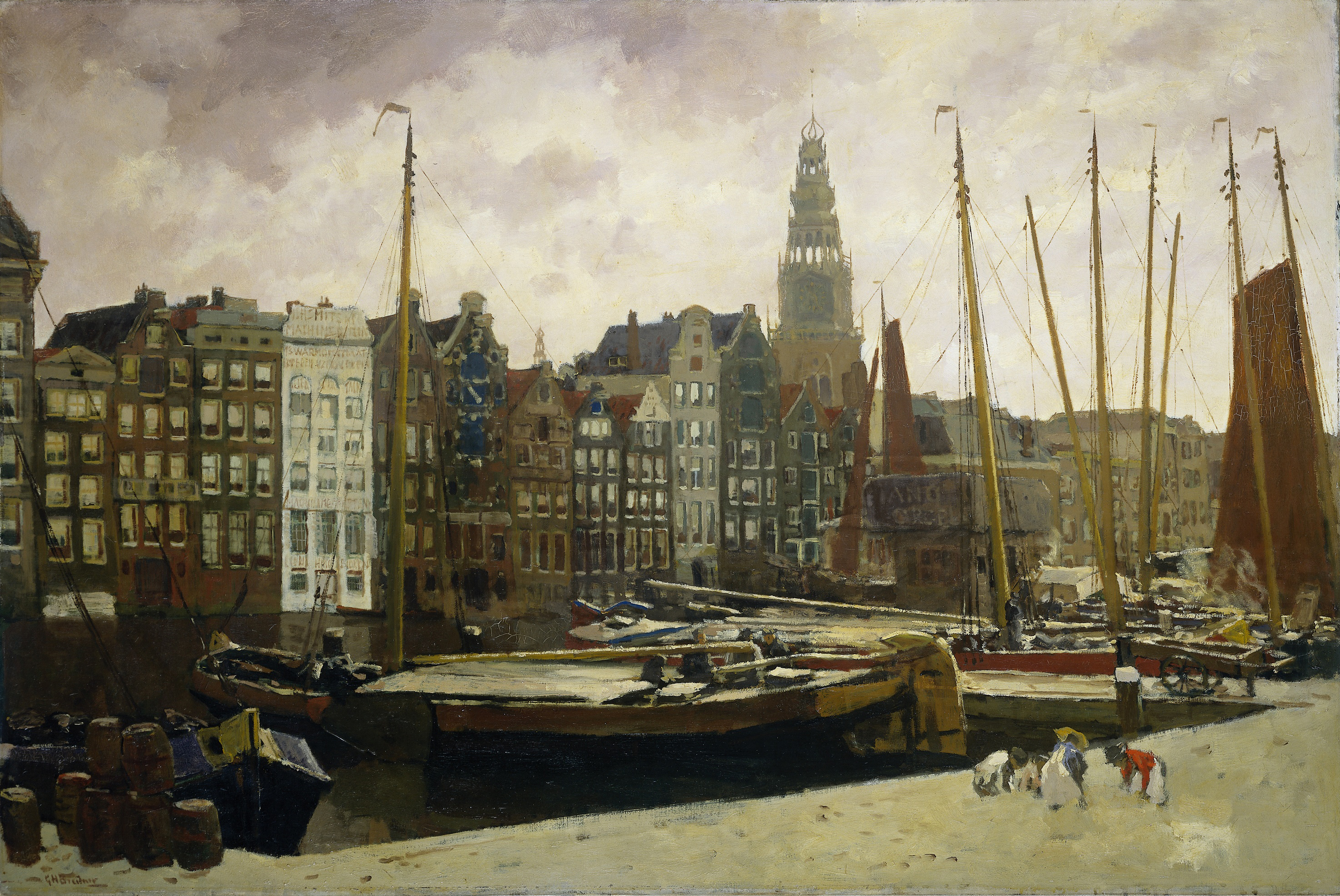
George Hendrik Breitner's Damrak in Amsterdam (1903)

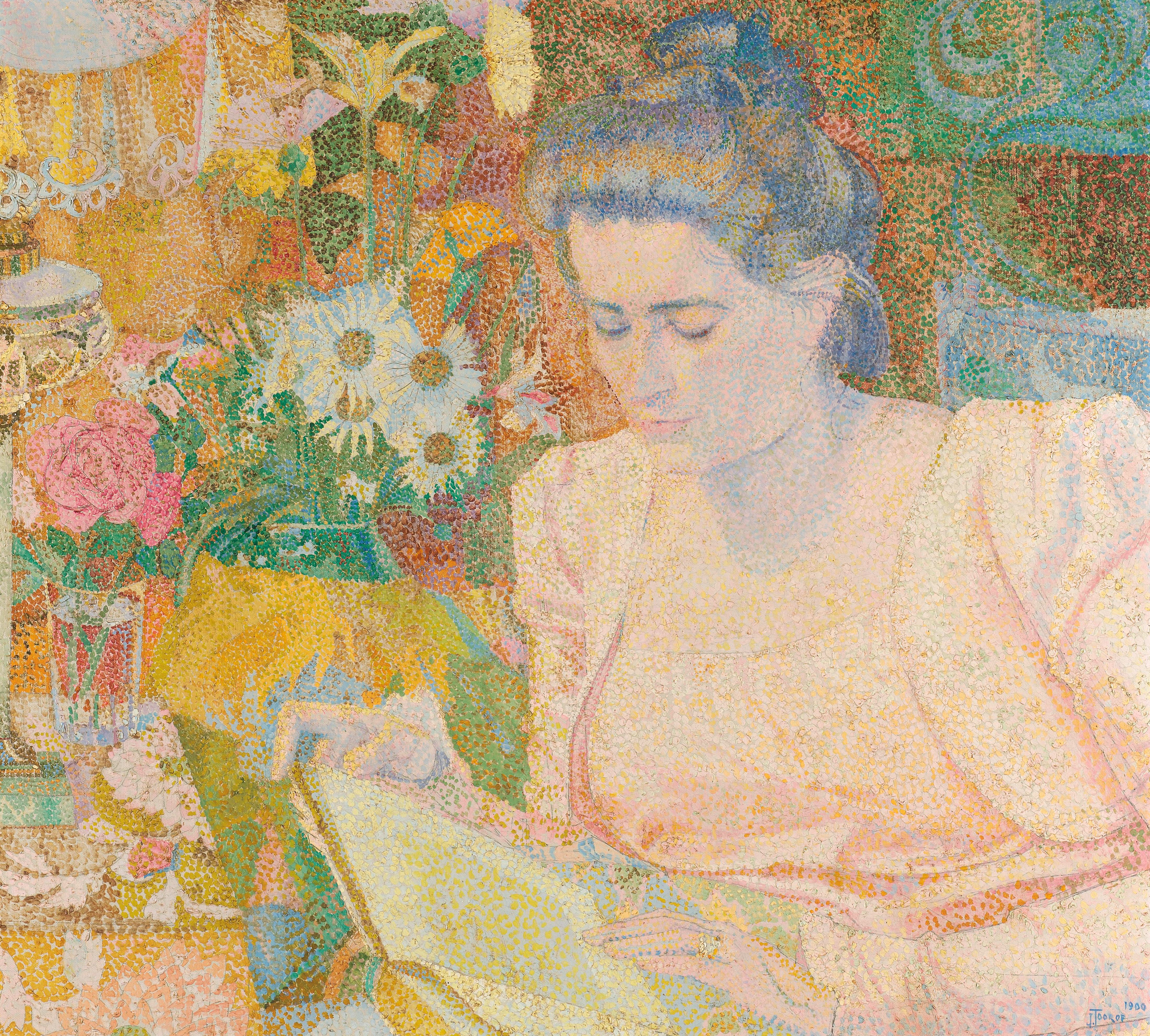
Jan Toorop's Portrait of Marie Jeanette de Lange (1900)

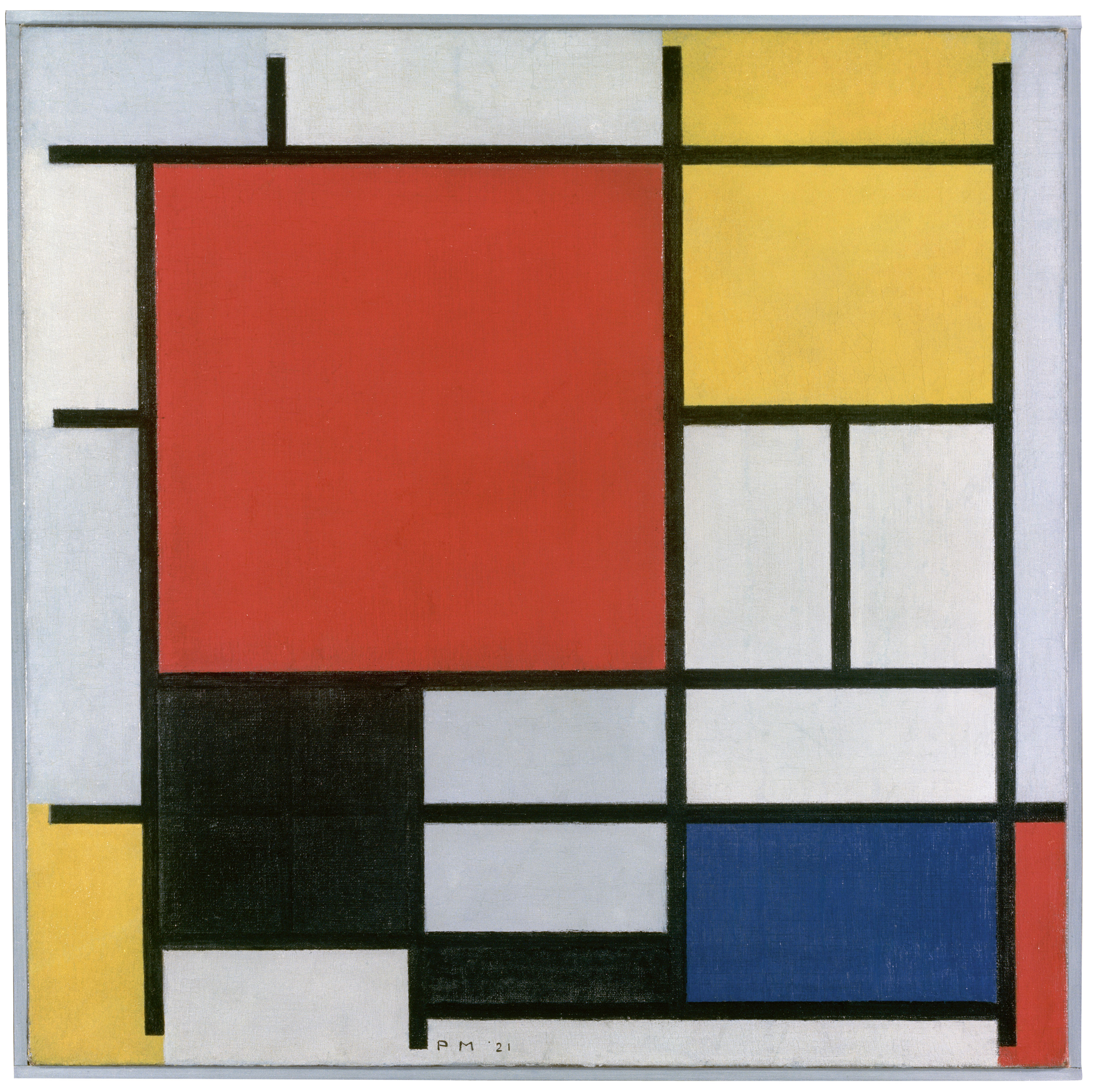
Piet Mondriaan's Composition in Red, Yellow, Blue and Black (1921)

- Carlos Amorales (1970)
- Lizzy Ansingh (1875–1959)
- Karel Appel (1921–2006)
- Floris Arntzenius (1864–1925)
- Johan Braakensiek (1858–1940)
- Nico Bakker (1936–1969)
- Nicolaas Bastert (1854–1939)
- Hans Op de Beeck (1969)
- Tjeerd Bottema (1884–1978)
- George Hendrik Breitner (1857–1923)
- Cornelius de Bruin (1870–1940)
- Constant Anton Nieuwenhuys (1920–2005)
- Antoon Derkinderen (1859–1925)
- Willehad Eilers (1981)
- Sophie Ernst (1972)
- Mounir Fatmi (1970)
- Georges de Feure (1868–1943)
- Ryan Gander (1976)
- Leo Gestel (1881–1941)
- Jan F. Geusebroek (1922–2015)
- Arnold Marc Gorter (1866–1933)
- Richard Roland Holst (1868–1938)
- Runa Islam (1970)
- Isaac Israëls (1865–1934)
- Cornelius Jetses (1873–1955)
- Arnold Hendrik Koning (1860–1945)
- Hendrik Maarten Krabbé (1868–1931)
- Lambert Lourijsen (1885–1950)
- Jacobus van Looy (1855–1930)
- Tala Madani (1981)
- Jill Magid (1974)
- Firoz Mahmud (1974)
- Kees Maks (1876–1967)
- Bjarne Melgaard (1967)
- Samuel Jessurun de Mesquita (1868–1944)
- Wally Moes (1856–1918)
- Piet Mondrian (1872–1944)
- Gerard Muller (1861–1929)
- Anthon van Rappard (1858–1892)
- Suze Robertson (1855–1922)
- Hendrika van der Pek (1867–1926)
- Gerda Rubinstein (1931–2022)
- Bojan Šarčević (1974)
- Jan Sluyters (1891–1957)
- Hobbe Smith (1862–1942)
- Mikołaj Sobczak (2021-2023)
- Chavalit Soemprungsuk (1939–2020)
- Jo Bauer-Stumpff (1873–1964)
- Willem Bastiaan Tholen (1860–1931)
- Jan Toorop (1858–1928)
- Jan Pieter Veth (1864–1925)
- Nicolaas Warb (1906-1957, enrolled 1924)
- Nicolaas van der Waay (1855–1936)
- Gerhard Westermann (1880–1971)
- Maurits van der Valk (1857–1935)
- Antonio Vega Macotela (2011–2012)
- Petrus Theodorus van Wijngaerdt (1873–1964)
- Jan Hillebrand Wijsmuller (1855–1925)
- Ernst Witkamp (1854–1897)
- Willem Witsen (1860–1923)
- Liu Ye (1964)

== See also ==
- Prix de Rome
