= Liu Ye =

Liu Ye may refer to:

- Liu Ye (Three Kingdoms) (died 234), Cao Wei politician during the Three Kingdoms period
- Liu Ye (Tang dynasty) (died 881), Tang Dynasty official
- Liu Ye (artist) (born 1964), Chinese artist
- Liu Ye (actor) (born 1978), Chinese actor
- Liu Ye, Chinese singer with the 2019–2021 boy band R1SE
