= Paule Vézelay =

British painter (1892–1984)

- Born: Marjorie Watson-Williams; 1892; Bristol
- Died: 1984 (aged 91–92)
- Education: Slade School of Fine Art
- Known for: Painting, Textile arts, Sculpture
- Movement: Constructivism, Modernism

Paule Vézelay (née Marjorie Watson-Williams; 1892–1984) was a British painter, known for her abstract art.

== Early life and education ==
Vézelay was born Marjorie Watson-Williams in Bristol, a daughter of a pioneering surgeon, Patrick Watson-Williams (1863–1938). Before the First World War she trained for a short period at the Slade School of Fine Art and then at the London School of Art. She also studied at Bristol School of Art and Chelsea Polytechnic.

== Life and work ==
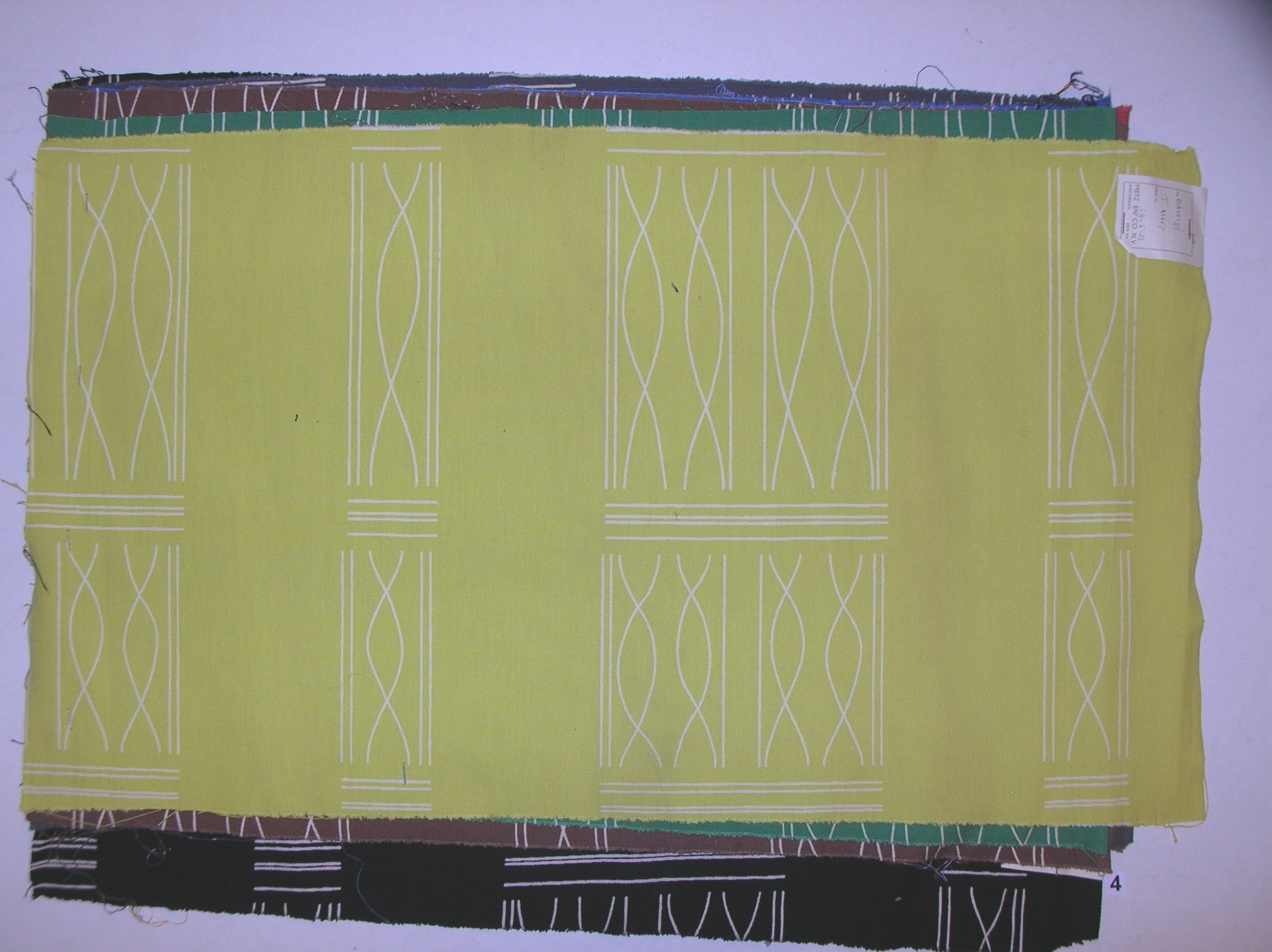
Cotton textile samples designed for Metz & Co by Paule Vezelay.

Vézelay first gained recognition as a figurative painter, with her first London show in 1921. She was invited to join the London Group in 1922.

Vézelay moved to France in 1926 and changed her name to Paule Vézelay possibly to identify herself with the School of Paris, although she is recorded as saying it was “for purely aesthetic reasons”. In 1928 she abandoned figurative painting and made her first abstract work (which is now lost) and from then on worked exclusively in an abstract mode. She was part of artistic circles that included Pablo Picasso, Henri Matisse and was friends with Sophie Taeuber-Arp.

In 1929 she met André Masson whom she fell in love and lived with for four years. Working side by side, they both painted dreamlike surrealist works. Vezelay became well respected in modernist Parisian art circles and was elected in the 1930s to membership of the French abstract movement, Abstraction-Création, which was largely established as a reaction to surrealism.

On the outbreak of the Second World War Vézelay moved back to Bristol, but had difficulty in gaining recognition from the British art establishment. It is considered that this was due to sexism and the war. She painted abstracts of war damage and was part of the Home Guard. In the 1950s she began to work in textile design for Metz & Co of Amsterdam and Heal's of London as a source of income but continued to produce abstract paintings. In 1952 she was invited by Andre Bloc, president of the Parisian constructivist abstract movement Groupe Espace, to form a London branch of that movement. After many difficulties and the refusal of some leading British abstract artists to join (including Victor Pasmore), she was successful in forming a small group of painters, sculptors and architects. The group held an exhibition in the Royal Festival Hall in 1955 which anticipated many elements of the better known 1956 Whitechapel Gallery exhibition, This is Tomorrow.

In many of her works, Vézelay's abstract imagery, such as floating quasi-biomorphic shapes, was outside the main characteristics of the constructivist approach. She had a lifelong aim of creating works which were "pleasing and happy"—not terms generally associated with Constructivism. However, her view that 'pure' abstract art enhanced the environment, and her involvement with Groupe Espace in the 1950s which promoted the concept of a synthesis (or close collaboration) between architects and abstract painters and sculptors, place her at least in part within the Constructivist tradition. Her post-war textile designs for Heals also place her firmly within the 20th century Modern Movement.

The Tate gave Vézelay a retrospective exhibition in 1983—a late recognition of the quality of her work and her significant place in art history as one of the first British artists to embark on a lifetime exploration and development of abstraction. A television programme of an interview with her was broadcast by the BBC in 1984 as part of a series about influential abstract artists.

Vézelay was included in Pallant House's Radical Women exhibition, which displayed the works of Jessica Dismorr and her contemporaries, in early 2020.

The Royal West of England Academy in Bristol organised a major retrospective of her work from 25 January 2025 until 27 April 2025.

== Collections ==
Vézelay's work is held in the following permanent collections:

- National Portrait Gallery, London: 5 works (as of 24 December 2024)
- Tate, London: 23 works (as of 24 December 2024)

== General references ==
- England, Jane, exhibition catalogues, 'Paule Vezelay, England Gallery, 2000, 2004, 2007
- Fowler. Alan, Constructivist Art in Britain 1913 - 2005. University of Southampton. 2006. PhD Thesis.
- Fowler, Alan, article in The Burlington Magazine, 'A Forgotten British Constructivist Group: the London Branch of Groupe Espace' March 2007.
