= Nicolaas Warb =

- Born: Sophia Elisabeth Warburg; 14 May 1906; Amsterdam, Netherlands
- Died: 3 August 1957 (aged 51); Hilversum, Netherlands
- Education: Rijksakademie (Academy of Fine Arts), Amsterdam, Académie de la Grande Chaumière, Paris
- Known for: Painting
- Movement: De Stijl, abstract art

Nicolaas Warb (14 May 1906, Amsterdam – 2 August 1957, Hilversum) was a pseudonym of Sophia Warburg, a Dutch abstract painter associated with movements and groups such as De Stijl, Société Réalités Nouvelles and Groupe Espace.

== Life ==
Sophia Warburg was born in Amsterdam, Netherlands, in 1906. She attended the local Academy of Fine Arts starting in 1924. Afterwards she worked at Metz & Co, where she met a fabric designer hired by the company, Sonia Delaunay, and became influenced by Delaunay's style.

She moved to Paris in 1929, where she studied at Académie de la Grande Chaumière and met emigre painters such as Mondrian and Georges Vantongerloo. She was interested in Goethe's Theory of Colours and like Mondrian studied Theosophy, following the spiritualist Rudolf Steiner. In 1930, she published her artistic manifesto, Aperçus et pen-sées sur la peinture abstraite (Insights and Thoughts on Abstract Painting), where she laid out her ideas for the moral, and spiritual role of abstract art (“Abstract art immerses one in an atmosphere of joy and tranquility.”)

She married the painter Francis Nicolas in 1942, and adopted his last name as part of a new masculine pseudonym, believing that critics didn't take women artists seriously.

Upon establishing Société Réalités Nouvelles in 1946, Warb joined it and took part in Salon des Réalités Nouvelles yearly. She also joined Groupe Espace, took part in group exhibitions of abstract art and had two solo exhibitions, in 1947 and 1954.

She died in 1957 of cancer, and the critic Michel Seuphor wrote in his obituary that “(She was) seeking to introduce spirituality into geometric form“. After death, she had a solo retrospective of her works in Galerie Maria de Beyrie in 1974. Her works are held in the Stedelijk Museum Amsterdam, the Musée d'Art Moderne de Paris and the Hammer Museum in Los Angeles.
