= Willem Hofhuizen =

Dutch painter

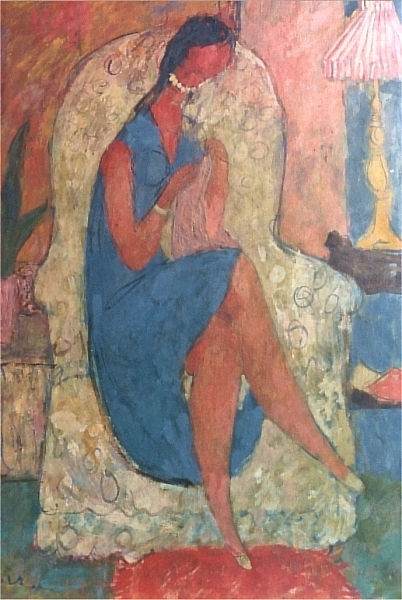
- The Mystery that is Woman
- Born: 27 July 1915
- Died: 23 December 1986 (aged 71)
- Known for: Painting
- Movement: Expressionist

Willem Hofhuizen (27 July 1915 – 23 December 1986) was a Dutch Expressionist painter.

== Life ==
Wilhelmus Johannes Maria (Willem) Hofhuizen was born in Amsterdam on 27 July 1915 but a few years later his parents moved to Roermond, where Willem spent his childhood at the Kapellerlaan. In 1931 he went to Nijmegen and then to Amsterdam to study at the teachers training college and later at the State Academy for the Visual Arts in Amsterdam, under Jurres and Campendonk. His fellow students at the Academy included Jaap Min, Karel Appel, Corneille and many others who would later rise to fame, as well as Jos Hagemeijer (1920–1991), whom he would later marry and who was a talented artist in her own right. However, it was the Kapellerlaan and the nearby chapel in Roermond that had the most profound impact on Hofhuizen's emotional development. There, he developed his emotional bond with the Catholic Church and his sense of the monumental. In Amsterdam, where he had his first workshop at the Lauriersgracht, he soon felt the urge to go the "Catholic south" of the Netherlands, far south, as he later told his friends. In 1944, during the Second World War, he moved to the "liberated" city of Deurne (where he stayed with Hendrik Wiegersma, general practitioner and fine artist, and Peer van den Molengraft, fine artist) at the request of industrialist and arts patron Henk te Strake and in 1946 he moved further south to the “Catholic” city of Maastricht, where he was to remain for the rest of his life. In Deurne his first son, Peter, was born. Later the Hofhuizens had a daughter, Josée, and another son, Domien.

Willem Hofhuizen had his second workshop in Maastricht at the Pieterstraat in the old mill above the workshop of Hubert Felix, a glazier. When this was to be demolished as part of a city redevelopment project, the municipality offered him all the space he wanted in the school for canal-boat children at the Lage Kanaaldijk, for a symbolic sum. There he continued to work and - after the judicial separation from his wife in 1956 - live, until his death on 23 December 1986. After his separation Tinie van Bragt - the wife of Tonnie van Bragt, professor at the Academy for the Visual Arts Jan van Eyck in Maastricht - cared for him for almost twenty years. She did his laundry for him and brought him food. To soften his grief and relieve his loneliness she sometimes came to read a book or exchange a few words with him at his house in the evening. Hofhuizen spent the last ten years of his life with his bosom friend, the painter Petran Vermeulen (1915–1988), and his dear friend Marianne Bakels. After Willem Hofhuizen’s death Petran Vermeulen said he wished that he, too, were dead. Two years later his wish was fulfilled.

Willem Hofhuizen went on study trips to Egypt, Italy, Spain, Portugal and also France, where he stayed in Paris for about a year.

== Work ==
Willem Hofhuizen's paintings reflect his inner world, in which man (more specifically, the archetypal woman) plays a dominant role. In many of his paintings he is one of the onlookers at the scene, looking over other people's shoulders and satisfied with what he sees. It is his world, which he depicts in his own characteristic manner, in which the transparency of materials plays a major role.

He created the sculptures Joy of Life and Olterdissen's Work at the Grote Looiersstraat in Maastricht. His works comprise oil paintings, gouaches, temperas, drawings, book illustrations (for example for a dictionary of the Maastricht dialect and a book about the liberation of Leiden), glass windows for churches in Utrecht and Brabant, frescos (Maastricht), sgraffitos (Cuyck, Brunssum), portraits and sculptures. He was also an art critic for a regional newspaper and for fifteen years he taught "cultural life" at the teachers training college of Veghel.

His works have been exhibited in Maastricht, Scheveningen, Amsterdam, Bonn, Paris, Rome, Barcelona and Tokyo, among others.

== Bibliography ==
- Vollmer II, Allgemeines Lexicon der bildenden Künstler des XX Jahrhundert, (General lexicon of visual artists of the 20th century), in German, published in 1955.
- Kunst op ware grootte, kleurenreprodukties naar fragmenten van werken uit de kunstcollectie van Staatsmijnen/DSM, (True-size art, color reproductions based on fragments of works from the art collections of Dutch State Mines/DSM), in Dutch, published around 1967.
- Lexicon Nederlandse Beeldende Kunstenaars 1750-1950, (Lexicon of Dutch visual artists, 1750–1950), in Dutch, published in 1969.
- Goden en heiligen in Limburg, (Gods and saints in Limburg), in Dutch, published in 1969.
- Limburgse Schilders, (Limburg painters), in Dutch, published in 1982.
- Beeldende Kunst in Limburg, (The visual arts in Limburg), in Dutch, published in May 1983.
- Twintig kunstenaars in een peeldorp, (Twenty artists in a village in the Peel region), in Dutch, published in October 1986.
- Beeldend Nederland, (Visual arts in the Netherlands), in Dutch, published on 9 April 1993

== Permanent Exhibited ==
- Museum the City Gallery Heerlen (Netherlands)
- The City Hall of Maastricht (Netherlands)
- The Limburg Provincial Government building in Maastricht
- The DSM head office in Heerlen (as part of The DSM Art Collection)
- The Academic Hospital of Maastricht
