= André Bloc =

French sculptor

André Bloc (Algiers, May 23, 1896 – New Delhi, November 8, 1966) was a French sculptor, magazine editor, and founder of several specialist journals. He founded the "Groupe Espace" in 1949.

His work is related to that of architects Auguste Perret, Henri Sauvage, and Jourdain.

== Biography ==
Born in Algeria, he moved to France in 1898. He studied engineering until 1920, then worked in motor and turbine factories.

In 1921 he met Le Corbusier who became influential in his career. After this meeting, Bloc moved towards architecture.

In 1922 he became the general secretary of the journal Science et Industrie. One year later, in 1923, he became the general secretary of the journal "Revue de l'ingénieur".

In 1924 he founded the journal "Revue général du Caoutchouc". In 1930 he founded the renowned journal L'Architecture d'Aujourd'hui. Bloc ran the publication until 1966. He appointed Pierre Vago as editor-in-chief in 1932.

Starting in 1940, Bloc turned towards sculpture. He created his first large sculptures in Paris between 1949 and 1956. From 1949 on, he founded several journals, such as "Art d'Aujourd'hui." These projects were part of his perennial interest in the synthèse des arts, or synthesis of the arts.

In 1951, in company with several artists, Bloc formed the group Espace. Its goal was to bring the ideals of constructivism and neo-plasticism to urbanism and the social arena. Artists and urbanists such as Jean Dewasne, Etienne Bóthy, Jean Gorin, Félix Del Marle, Edgard Pillet, Victor Vasarely, Sonia Delaunay, Nicolaas Warb (née Sophie Warburg), Simone Servanes and Nicolas Schöffer were members of the group, which considered architecture, painting, sculpture and art in general as a social phenomenon.

In 1952 the project and construction of the Bellevue house at Meudon was finished. From then until his death in 1966, Bloc worked primarily as a sculptor and decorator. In 1959 he participated at II. documenta in Kassel. Bloc completed several sculptures, including pieces in Tehran, Nice, Jacksonville, and Dakar. His sculptures demonstrate an organic sculptural form somewhere between architecture and sculpture.

== Literary works ==
- L'Architecture d'aujourd'hui, 1930
- Aujourd'hui, 1955.

== Sculptures ==
=== Carlson/Bloc Tower ===
André Bloc sought to combine the disciplines of sculpture and architecture. The 1965 California International Sculpture Symposium's collaborative merging of art and industry echoed his notions. Bloc's dynamic career pushed the theoretical, social, and technological boundaries of design and function, exemplifying the symposium's organizer Kenn Glenn's desire to "challenge the sculptors to expand their creative limits." Bloc, a renowned engineer, artist, and architect, took on the project and spent eight weeks in the summer of 1965 working with structural engineers, architects, and builders to prepare drawings, blueprints, and a miniature maquette of this massive tower. While financial issues delayed the building of Bloc's design for seven years, the Carlson/Bloc Tower finally soared 65 feet above the CSULB campus, establishing a visible emblem of the institution's student population of 30,000 students while also showcasing Bloc's innovative oeuvre. Bloc once stated that his idea for the tower design came from his studies since towns used to be distinguished by aesthetically beautiful and functional monuments like this. He connected his project to a lengthy historic past of structures, such as the Islamic minaret, whose winding interiors might evoke in man a spiritual journey to enlightenment, by deploying a coiled framework.

California State College at Long Beach released a press announcement on December 2, 1971, six years after the symposium, announcing the long-awaited building of the Carlson/Bloc Tower. The tower's construction had been postponed since the 1965 symposia, with an estimated cost of $44,900. Finally, work on the tower could begin courtesy of Louise Carlson's generous donation and extra funding from the LBCSC Foundation.

The Carlson/ Bloc Tower (1965–1972) is a public artwork located in the CSULB campus and created by French artist André Bloc. Constructed between the Molecular Science building and the University Student Union, the Carlson/ Bloc Tower stands as both an historical landmark and an artwork that was included in the 1965 California International Sculpture Symposium (CISS). Designed by André Bloc, the 157-ton, white concrete tower came to fruition in 1965, after a seven-year delay related to the funding for the sculpture. During this period, Bloc collaborated with several professionals, including structural engineers, architects, and contractors to develop plans and a maquette for the sculpture. Due to the immense quantity of concrete needed to execute the sculpture, and with the uncertainty of funding, construction of Bloc's tower came to a halt, and was the only sculpture, out of the nine created for 1965 sculpture symposium, that was incomplete. Six years later in December 1971, and after generous donations from the Louise Carlson fund and the LBCSC foundation, the California State College at Long Beach (name of CSULB at the time) announced that the Carlson/ Bloc Tower was to be constructed. In the Spring of 1972, the completion of the Carlson/ Bloc Tower finally came to realization with a total cost of $44,900. Standing at 65 feet, the architectural sculpture tapers lightly toward the sky, and, at the time in 1972, was capable of being seen from a distance of over fifteen miles.

Before creating the Carlson/ Bloc Tower, André Bloc was completing a series of experimental structures known as “sculptures habitacles,” which translates to “habitable” in English. As an artist that merged both sculpture and architecture, Bloc first started experimenting with his habitacles at his home in Meudon, France. After completing Habitacle 1 in 1962, he completed two more on his home grounds. His final habitacle to be realized was his Carlson/ Bloc Tower.
