= Egbert Schaap =

Dutch painter (1862–1939)

Egbert Rubertus Derk Schaap
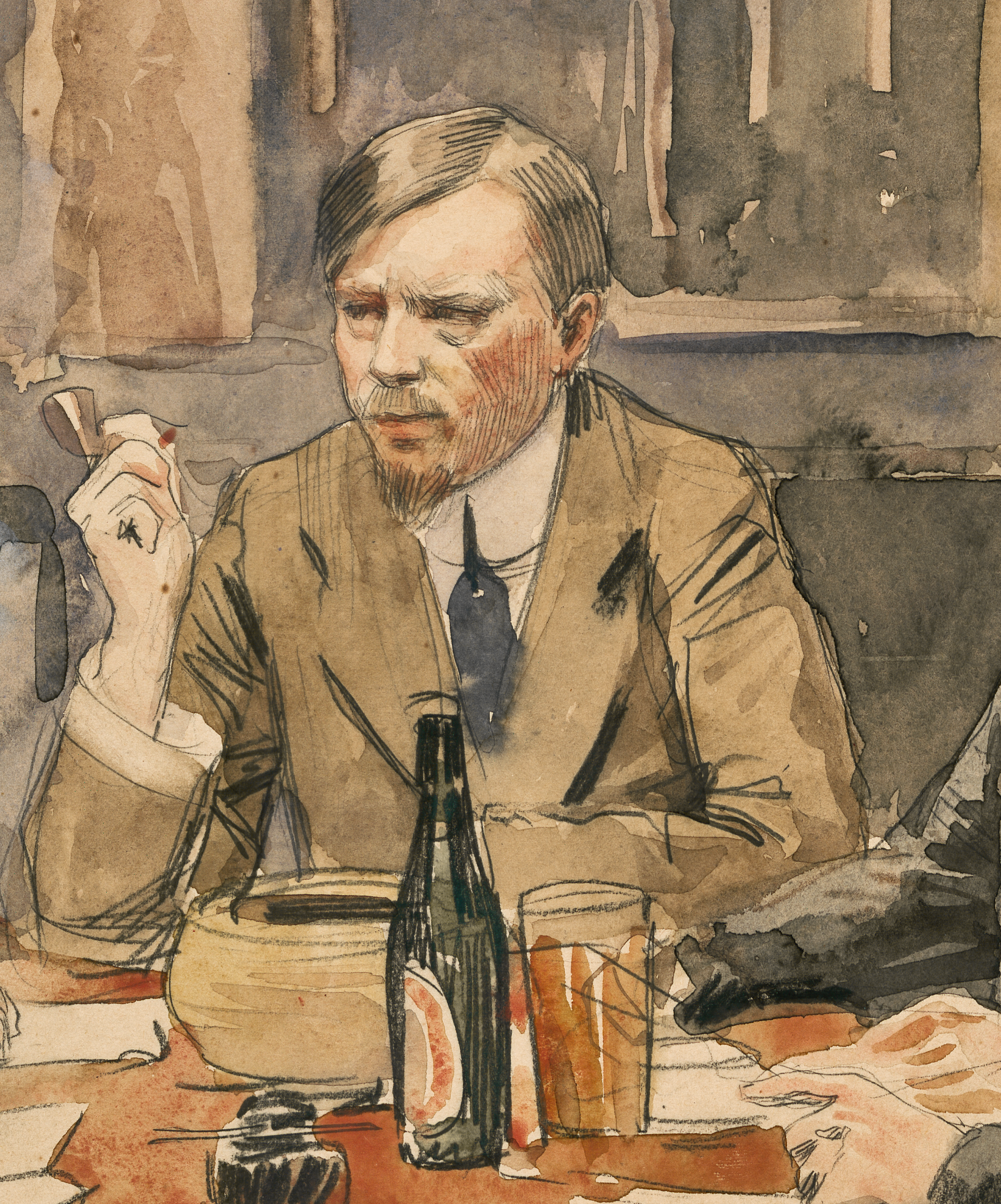
- Born: 4 July 1862; Nigtevecht, Netherlands
- Died: 24 May 1939 (aged 76); Ankeveen, Netherlands
- Occupation: Painter

Egbert Rubertus Derk Schaap (4 July 1862 – 24 May 1939) was a Dutch draughtsman and painter. His work was part of the art competitions at the 1924 Summer Olympics and the 1936 Summer Olympics. He married a fellow artist, Hendrika van der Pek.

The Rijksmuseum in Amsterdam has a few of his paintings and almost fifty of his drawings in their collection.

== Gallery ==
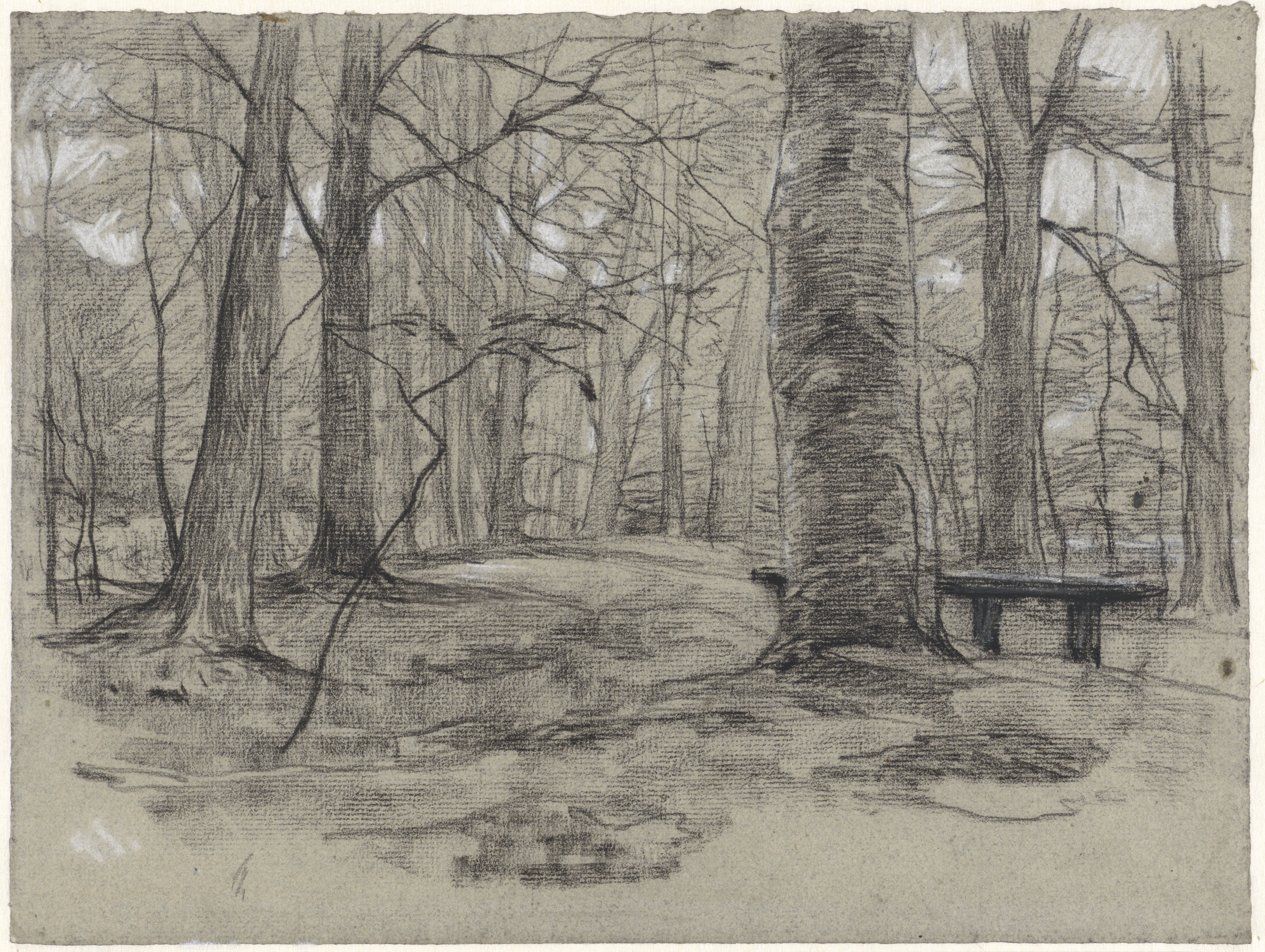
Bench in a forest

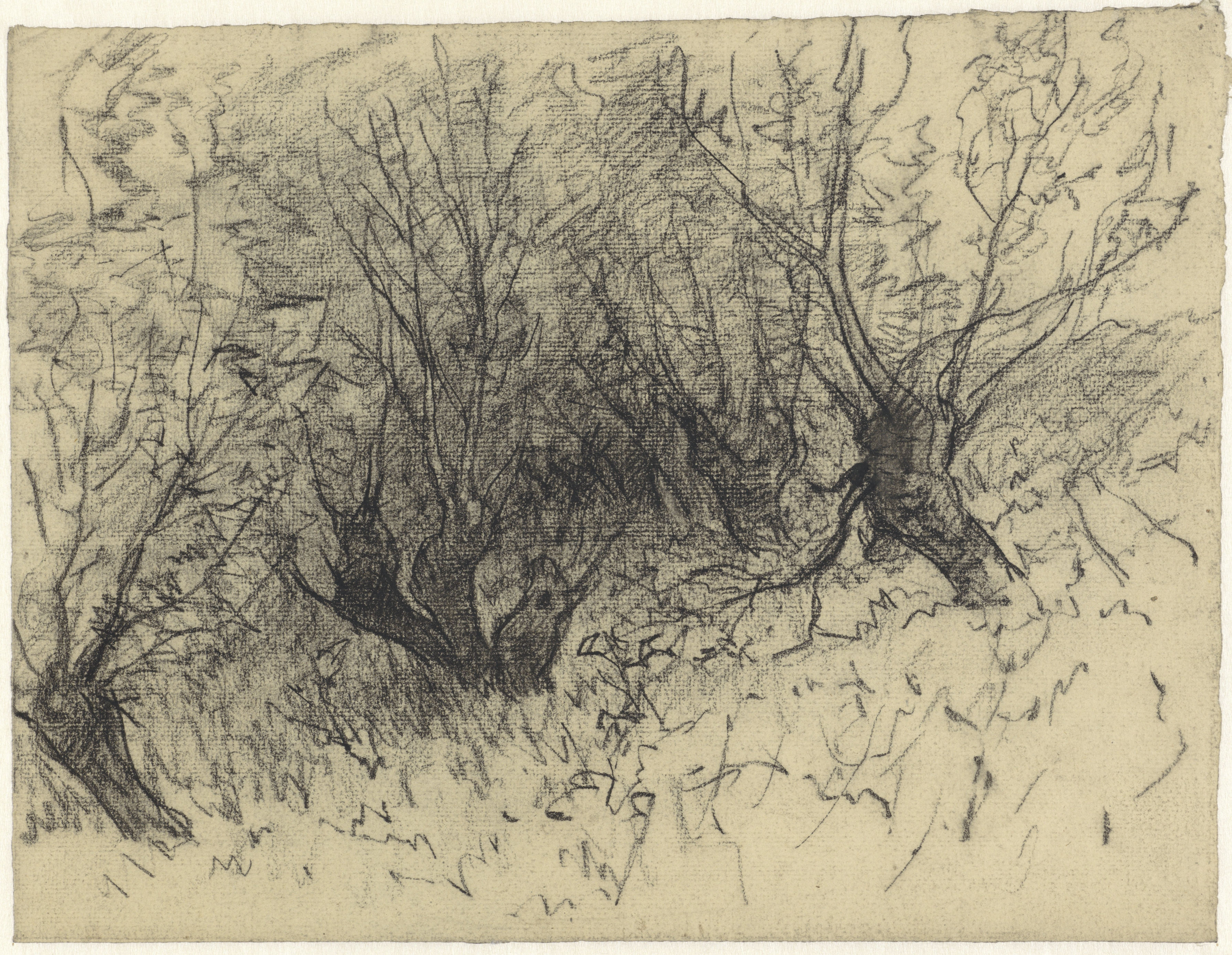
Pollard willows

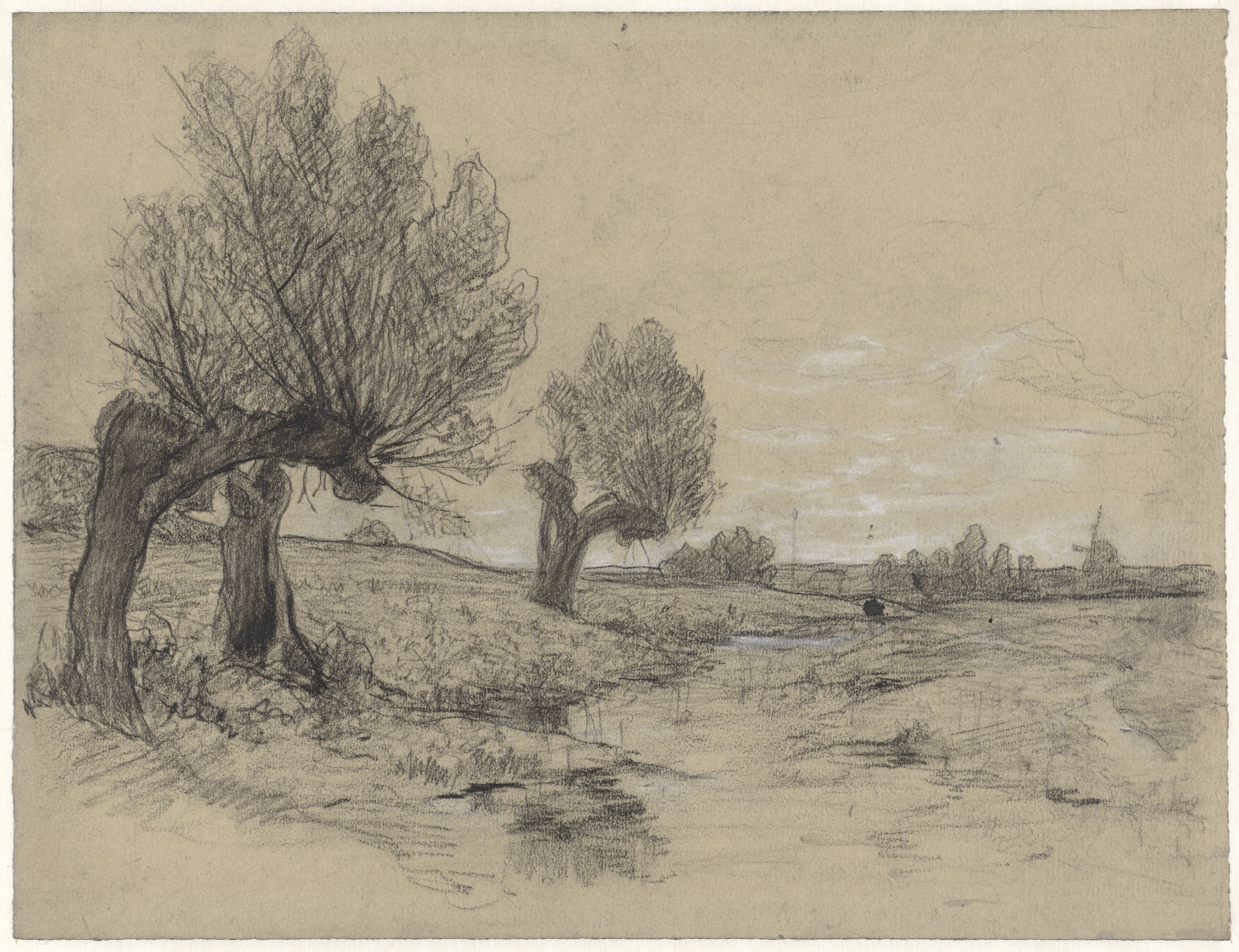
Pollard willows

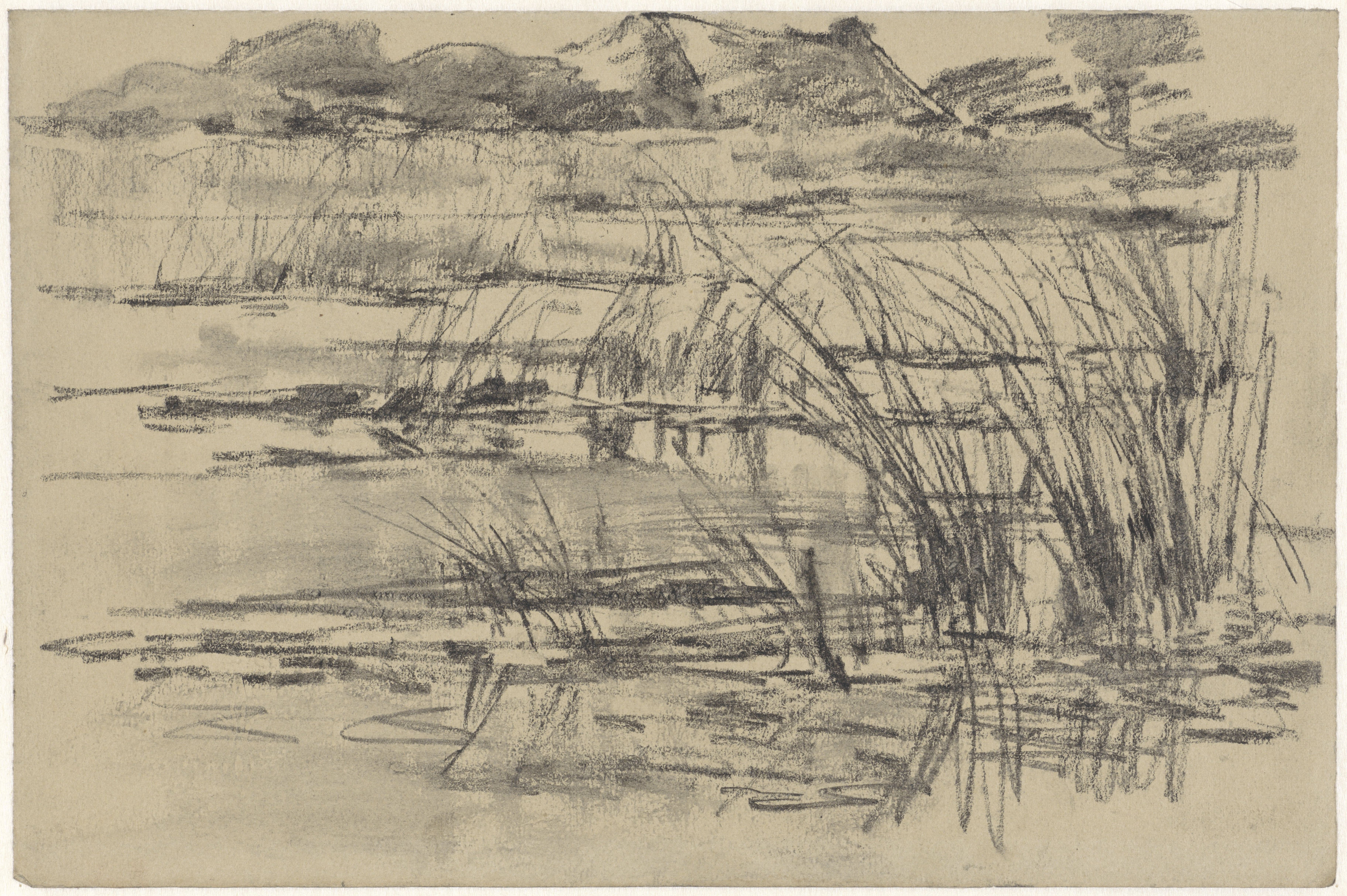
Reeds at a pond
