= Nico Bakker =

Dutch painter (1936–1969)

- Born: Albertus Nicolaas Johannes Bakker; 3 January 1936; Amsterdam, Netherlands
- Died: 21 November 1969 (aged 33); Meppel, Netherlands
- Education: Rijksakademie van beeldende kunsten
- Movement: Realism, abstract
- Children: 4
- Awards: Prix de Rome; 1961 painting
- Website: www.anjbakker.nl

Albertus Nicolaas Johannes Bakker (3 January 1936 – 21 November 1969) was a Dutch painter.

== Biography ==
Bakker was born in Amsterdam and studied there at the Rijksakademie van beeldende kunsten. He was a pupil of Otto B. de Kat and Gé Röling. He became a teacher at the same institution in 1967 and taught Joost Barbiers.

Bakker worked in Amsterdam and Nieuwkoop. In 1961, he won the Prix de Rome. He worked in Switzerland for a year where he met Walter Clénin and made gouaches. He also made gouache paintings of IJmuiden, Amsterdam and later Nieuwkoop. He made a series of gouaches for a topographical atlas of Amsterdam and of the Delta Works for Rijkswaterstaat.

Bakker died in 1969 in the hospital of Meppel, as a result of a car crash. He had a wife and four children.
