= Lambert Lourijsen =

Dutch artist (1885–1950)

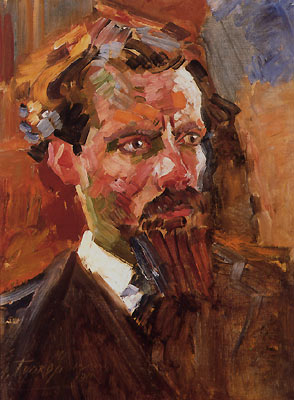
- Portrait of Lambert Lourijsen (1911) by Jan Toorop
- Born: Lambertus Theodorus Cornelis Lourijsen; November 22, 1885; Breda, Netherlands
- Died: June 10, 1950; Haarlem, Netherlands
- Education: Rijksschool voor Kunstnijverheid Amsterdam, Rijksakademie van beeldende kunsten, Haagse Academie van Beeldende Kunsten
- Occupation(s): Painter, Drawer, Glazier, Mosaic artist, Goldsmith

Lambert Lourijsen; (22 November 1885 – 10 June 1950) was a Dutch cross-disciplinary artist.

== Biography ==
Lourijsen was born as the son of Johannes Lourijsen and Cornelia Maria Petronella Boelen. His brother was the architect Frans Lourijsen (1889-1934). Lourijsen moved to Amsterdam in 1902 and studied for one year at the Rijksschool voor Kunstnijverheid Amsterdam and continued his studies at the Rijksakademie van beeldende kunsten (1905-1906, 1908–1911) as well as the Haagse Academie van Beeldende Kunsten (1906-1907) He was a pupil and friend of Jan Toorop. In 1911 he won the silver medal at the Prix de Rome, and went to France and Italy for studies. Lourijsen was an active portrait painter and draftsman and also served from 1912 onwards as a lecturer at the Ignatiuscollege in Amsterdam. He married Henriëtte Straatemeier in 1914 in the village of Domburg. Jan Toorop served as witness during the wedding ceremony.

In 1923 Lourijsen and his family moved to Haarlem and devoted himself to monumental arts and crafts for churches. He designed stained-glass windows and mosaics, and was also responsible for other parts of the interior, including carvings, candlesticks, monstrances, murals and carpets.

From 1935 onwards Lourijsen devoted himself once again to painting. He gave private tutorials to Frans Bosen and Corinne Franzén-Heslenfeld, among others. After the end of the Second World War orders from churches arrived as before. In 1949 he has his last assignment, a design for fourteen Stations of the Cross in the Sint-Agatha Church in Zandvoort. He died the following year, at the age of 64, and was buried next to the Agatha Church.
