= Richard Eckersley (designer) =

British graphic designer (1941–2006)

- Born: Richard Hilton Eckersley; 20 February 1941; Lancashire, England
- Died: 16 April 2006 (aged 65); Lincoln, Nebraska, US
- Occupation: British graphic designer
- Relatives: Tom Eckersley

Richard Hilton Eckersley (20 February 1941 – 16 April 2006) was a British graphic designer best known for experimental computerized typography designed to complement deconstructionist academic works.

Born in Lancashire, England, his father Tom Eckersley was a noted poster designer during and after the Second World War, later to become head of the School of Art and Design at the London College of Printing in the 1960s. After attending Trinity College in Dublin, Eckersley began his design career at Lund Humphries, the publisher of Typographica and The Penrose Annual, where E. McKnight Kauffer had once been art director.

He later joined the state-sponsored Kilkenny Design Workshops in Ireland. After six years there, Eckersley took a teaching position in the United States, and in 1981 he got a job at the University of Nebraska Press, where he shook up the field with computer-designed typography for Avital Ronell's Telephone Book: Technology, Schizophrenia, Electric Speech. The unorthodox design had the intended effect of breaking up the text's readability.
