= Herbert Spencer (graphic designer) =

British graphic designer, editor and teacher (1924–1977)

- Born: 22 June 1924; London, England
- Died: 11 March 2002 (aged 77); Falmouth, England
- Known for: Typography, photography

Herbert Spencer (22 June 1924 – 11 March 2002) was a British designer, editor, writer, photographer and teacher. He was born in London.

== Life and work ==
Spencer was an RAF cartographer during the Second World War. He taught typography at the Central School of Arts and Crafts from 1949 to 1955. He married the artist and designer Vera Spencer.

In 1966 he became a senior research fellow in the print research department of the Royal College of Art; he was a professor of graphic arts there from 1978 until 1985.

In 1949 Spencer founded Typographica, a design and visual arts journal. He was editor of all the thirty-two issues published, in two series of sixteen issues each, from 1949 until it closed in 1967. He also designed and wrote for it. Between 1964 and 1973 Spencer was also editor of The Penrose Annual.

=== Road signs ===
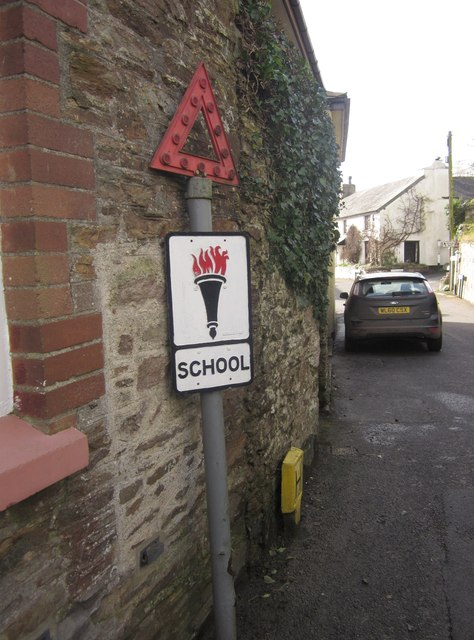
The 'Torch of Knowledge' school sign, pre-Worboys

Spencer wished to prove that British road signs were chaotic. He therefore photographed road signs and published the results in two photographic essays in Typographica in 1961. As a result, the Ministry of Transport set up the Worboys Committee in 1963 to devise a consistent system of signage for British road signs.

== Publications ==
Pioneers of Modern Typography was a book Spencer wrote in 1969. It drew on and re-used material previously published by Spencer in the journal Typographica, which had brought to Britain some of the typographical experiments and design history of continental Europe. Lund Humphries described the book as follows:

"Modern typography does not have its origins in the conventional printing industry. Its roots are entwined with those of twentieth-century painting, poetry and architecture, and it flowered quite suddenly and dramatically in the twenty years following the publication of Marinetti's Futurist manifesto in 1909."

- Design in Business Printing, 1952
- Traces of Man (with photographs by Herbert Spencer), Lund Humphries, London, 1967.
- The Visible Word (legibility studies at RCA), Royal College of Art, London, first édition in 1968, second edition in 1969.
- Words, words, words London, Cologne, 1972
- New Alphabets A to Z (with Colin Forbes). London, NY, 1973
- The Liberated page London, 1987
