= Eric Lombers =

British poster designer

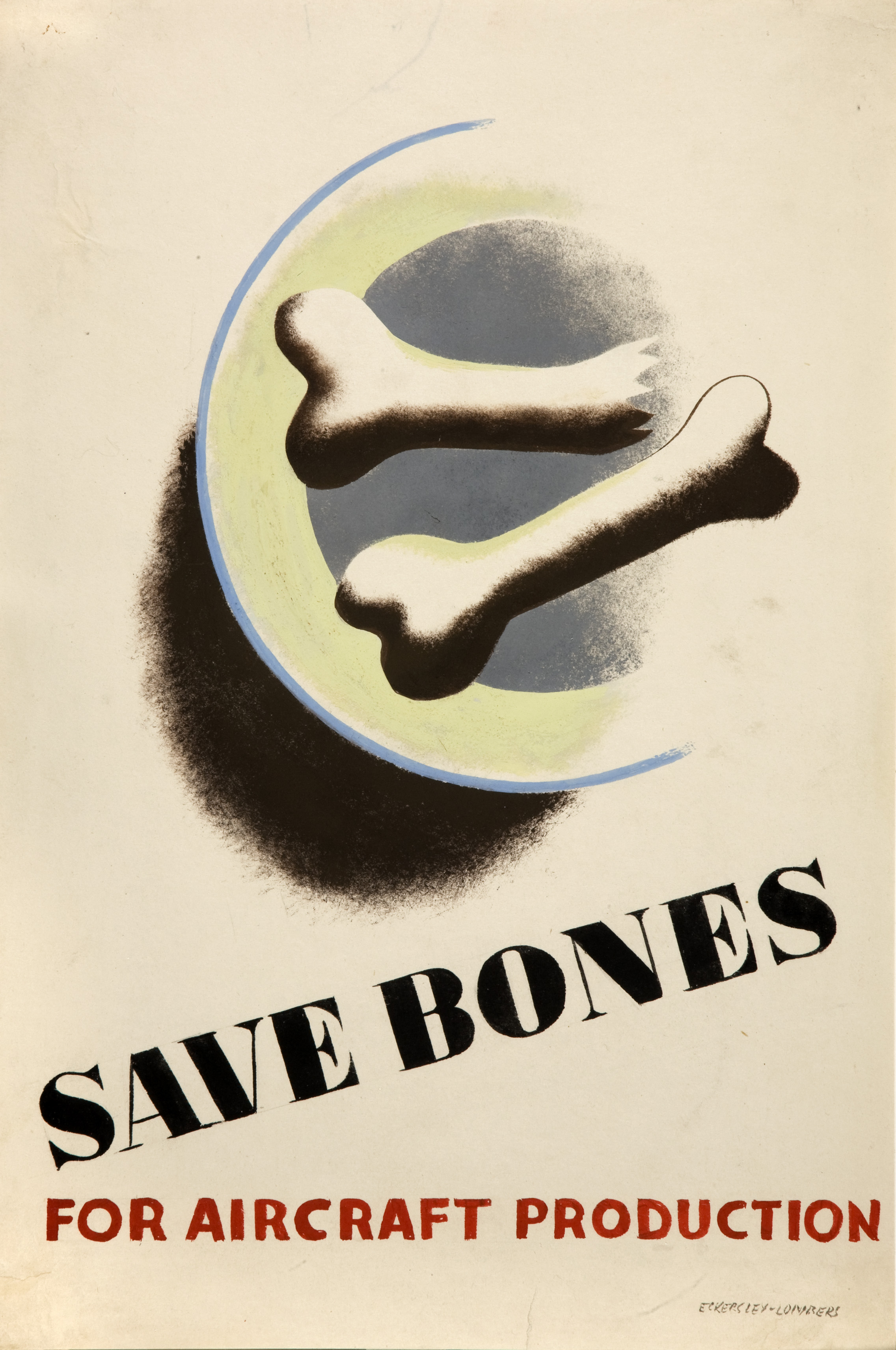
Save bones for aircraft production by Eckersley Lombers

George Eric Lombers (1914–1978) was a British poster artist.

He was born in Worsley, near Salford, Lancashire, the son of George Lombers, an accounts clerk, and his wife, Mary.

He trained at the Salford School of Art and in 1935, moved to London with fellow student Tom Eckersley, and worked for London Transport and others, having been recommended to Frank Pick by a former tutor.

In 1946, he moved to Bradford with his wife Marjorie and their children, and taught graphic design at Bradford School of Art.

His work is in the permanent collection of the Art Institute of Chicago, the Museum of Modern Art, and the London Transport Museum.
