= Bojan Šarčević =

- Born: 1974 (age 51–52); Belgrade, Serbia
- Education: École des Beaux-Arts, Rijksakademie
- Known for: Visual artist, educator
- Website: www.bojansarcevic.net

Bojan Šarčević (pronounced [bɔ̌jan ʃǎːrtʃɛv̞itɕ]; born 1974) is a Serbian visual artist and educator. His work includes video, installations, site-responsive architectural interventions, photographic collage, more or less abstract sculpture, and printed publications.

== Biography ==
Born in 1974, in Belgrade, Serbia. Šarčević spent part of his childhood in Morocco and Algeria, but was living in Sarajevo at the outbreak of the Bosnian war.

Šarčević studied at École des Beaux-Arts in Paris, graduating in 1997. He continued his studies at Rijksakademie in Amsterdam.
He has been a professor at Beaux-Arts de Paris since 2016 and a tutor at the postgraduate program deAteliers in Amsterdam since 2008.

Šarčević held his first solo exhibition "It seems that an animal is in the world as water in the water", at the gallery BQ in Cologne.

== Collections ==
- 21st Century Museum of Contemporary Art, Kanazawa, Japan
- Daimler Contemporary, Berlin, Germany
- Dallas Museum of Art, Dallas, TX, USA
- Fondazione Morra Greco, Naples, Italy
- FRAC Auvergne, Clermont-Ferrand, France
- FRAC Poitou-Charentes, Angoulême, France
- Institut d’art contemporain, Villeurbanne, France
- Kiasma – Museum of Contemporary Art, Helsinki, Finland
- Kunstmuseum Liechtenstein, Vaduz, Liechtenstein
- MUDAM – Musée d’Art Moderne Grand-Duc Jean, Luxembourg City, Luxembourg
- Museum Abteiberg, Mönchengladbach, Germany
- MMK – Museum für Moderne Kunst, Frankfurt am Main, Germany
- Sammlung Boros, Berlin, Germany
- Sammlung Haubrok, Berlin, Germany
- TBA21 – Thyssen-Bornemisza Art Contemporary, Vienna, Austria
