= Hendrika van der Pek =

Dutch painter

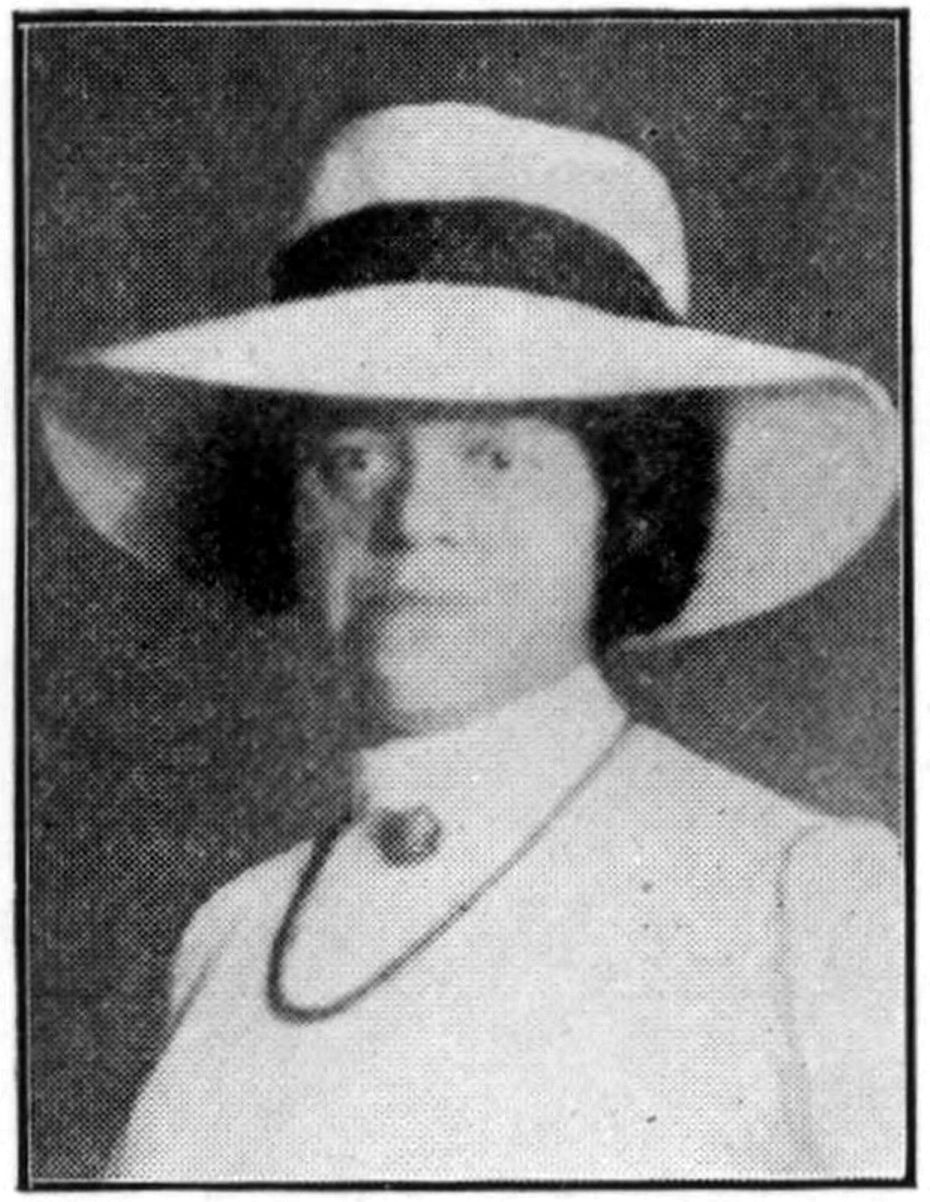
- H. W. J. Schaap van der Pek, 1913
- Born: 9 January 1867; Amsterdam, Netherlands
- Died: 23 August 1926 (aged 59); Ankeveen, Netherlands
- Occupation: Painter

Hendrika Wilhelmina Jacoba van der Pek, later Hendrika Schaap (9 January 1867 – 23 August 1926), was a Dutch painter. She was educated at the Rijksnormaalschool voor Teekenonderwijzers (National Normal School for Drawing Teachers) and the Rijksakademie van Beeldende Kunsten (State Academy of Fine Arts). Her art featured flowers, farmhouses, biblical scenes, historical performances, landscapes, portraits, and still life.

She was married to the artist Egbert Schaap. They lived together in a villa near the artists’ village of Kortenhoef.

Her works Jumping Horseman and Harbor for Yachts were posthumously submitted to the painting event in the art competition at the 1932 Summer Olympics.
