= Tom Eckersley =

English poster artist

OBE Tom Eckersley
- Born: September 30, 1914
- Died: August 4, 1997 (aged 82)
- Occupations: Poster artist and teacher of design

Tom Eckersley OBE (30 September 1914 – 4 August 1997) was an English poster artist and teacher of design.

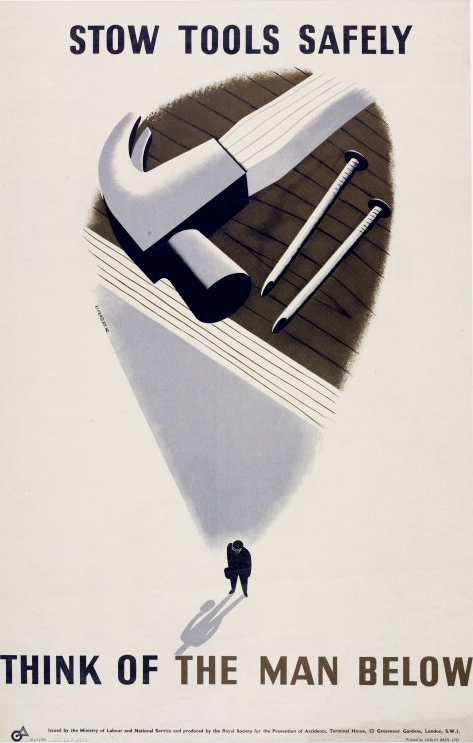
1942 poster for the United Kingdom's Ministry of Labour and National Service.

== Early career ==
Tom Eckersley was born on 30 September 1914 in Lancashire. His artistic training began in 1930 when he enrolled at Salford Art School, where his abilities were soon recognised and he was awarded the Heywood Medal for Best Student. One of his instructors was Martin Tyas. In 1934 Eckersley moved to London with the express purpose of becoming a freelance poster designer. He was accompanied by Eric Lombers (1914–1978), a fellow student and future collaborator on commissioned poster designs. He later cited poster artists Adolphe Mouron Cassandre and Edward McKnight Kauffer as major influences.

Eckersley-Lombers posters were both aesthetic and functional, thereby perfectly fulfilling advertisers' criteria. Eckersley-Lombers always supplied full-size artwork with hand drawn lettering for their poster designs. Eckersley was involved not only in graphic design but in its teaching: he and Lombers worked as visiting lectures in poster design at Westminster School of Art. The partnership benefited from the cultural recognition of the poster as a design piece in the 1930s and from the fact that mass media was yet to explode, meaning that the poster was the only means of shouting a message to a mass audience. However, this was in turn restricted by tariffs that one had to pay to put up posters in authorised spaces. Posters thus needed to be memorable even to someone strolling past and therefore maybe only glimpsing it once.

Eckersley developed a style that emphasised geometric forms, flat graphic designs emphasising shape rather than depth of perspective, and a strong use of contrast by several means, including varying the size of elements, or using stark lines and shadowing with gradients. Eckersley's style was similar in its approach to Modernist graphic designers in France and Germany during the same period. His bold, simple style was well-suited for the workplace safety posters he produced for the Royal Society for the Prevention of Accidents throughout his career.

== World War II ==
The start of World War II in 1939 effectively marked the end of Eckersley's partnership with Lombers, as they joined different military services and there was a decline in demand for commercial advertising. This led Eckersley to create posters for the Royal Society for the Prevention of Accidents (RoSPA), aimed at workers in factories and industrial settings that often supported the military in someway. These posters are striking in their bluntness; with little text it is the illustration that catches the eye. Most use block colours and cut out shapes to form the designs. Having originally joined the Royal Air Force and being charged with cartographic work, Eckersley was transferred to the Publicity Section of the Air Ministry, this allowed him to work from home and take commercial commissions again, for example from the General Post Office. In 1948 his contribution was recognised with the granting of an Order of the British Empire (OBE) for services to poster design. During the war the realisation of the posters ability to communicate complex messages was recognised, as propaganda messages were successfully conveyed by posters and mass media was developed.

After the war commissions for government posters reduced and, due to rationing and financial strain, commercial advertising was still restricted. However, Eckersley was able to gain commissions from new sources such as Gillette and old sources such as the General Post Office. He also did some work as a book illustrator, for example illustrating his wife's book Cat O'Nine Lives in 1946.

== Eckersley as a lecturer ==
Eckersley taught poster design at the Westminster School of Art from 1937 to 1939. In 1954 Eckersley joined the London College of Printing to teach undergraduates. Here he established the first undergraduate courses in graphic design in Britain. He was Head of Graphic Design at the College from 1957 until 1977. Whilst at the college he designed posters to inform staff and students, for example one reminds students to return overdue library books. Eckersley also continued to complete commissioned work, adding The United Nations Children's Fund, the World Wide Fund for Nature, the National Business Calendar Design Awards and Cooks to his list of clients. Therefore, Eckersley was both a practitioner and a teacher, thus allowing his designs and teaching to remain relevant to changing audiences. Notable graduates who benefitted from Eckersley's tutelage include illustrator Ralph Steadman, advertising's John Hegarty and art pathfinder Charles Saatchi, graphic designers Michael Peters and Howard Milton.

== Eckersley's legacy ==
Eckersley was one of the foremost poster designers and graphic communicators of the last century, who combined practice with education. In addition to poster making and book illustration he also produced magazine covers (for example for The Queen) and logos. His designs often employ an abstract like quality and collage to convey their message but whatever the technique Eckersley's designs have one common factor: they bring together text and pictures to relate complex messages in a direct way. The range of companies who commissioned both the Eckersley-Lombers partnership and Eckersley individually reflects the wide appeal of their/his striking designs: Shell-Mex & BP, BP, the BBC, London Transport, the Ministry of Information (from 1946 the Central Office of Information), the Royal Society for the Prevention of Accidents (RoSPA), Austin Reed, the General Post Office, Gillette, The United Nations Children's Fund, the World Wide Fund for Nature, the National Business Calendar Design Awards, Cooks, British Leprosy Relief Association, National Bus Company, London College of Printing, Guinness, the Wildscreen International Wildlife Film and Television Festival, the Inner London Education Authority, City & Guilds of London Institute, Imperial War Museum and advertising agency WS Crawford. He also designed posters for events and seasons for example, one for a seminar Eckersley gave at the Grafiska Institute, Stockholm, Sweden, in 1960.

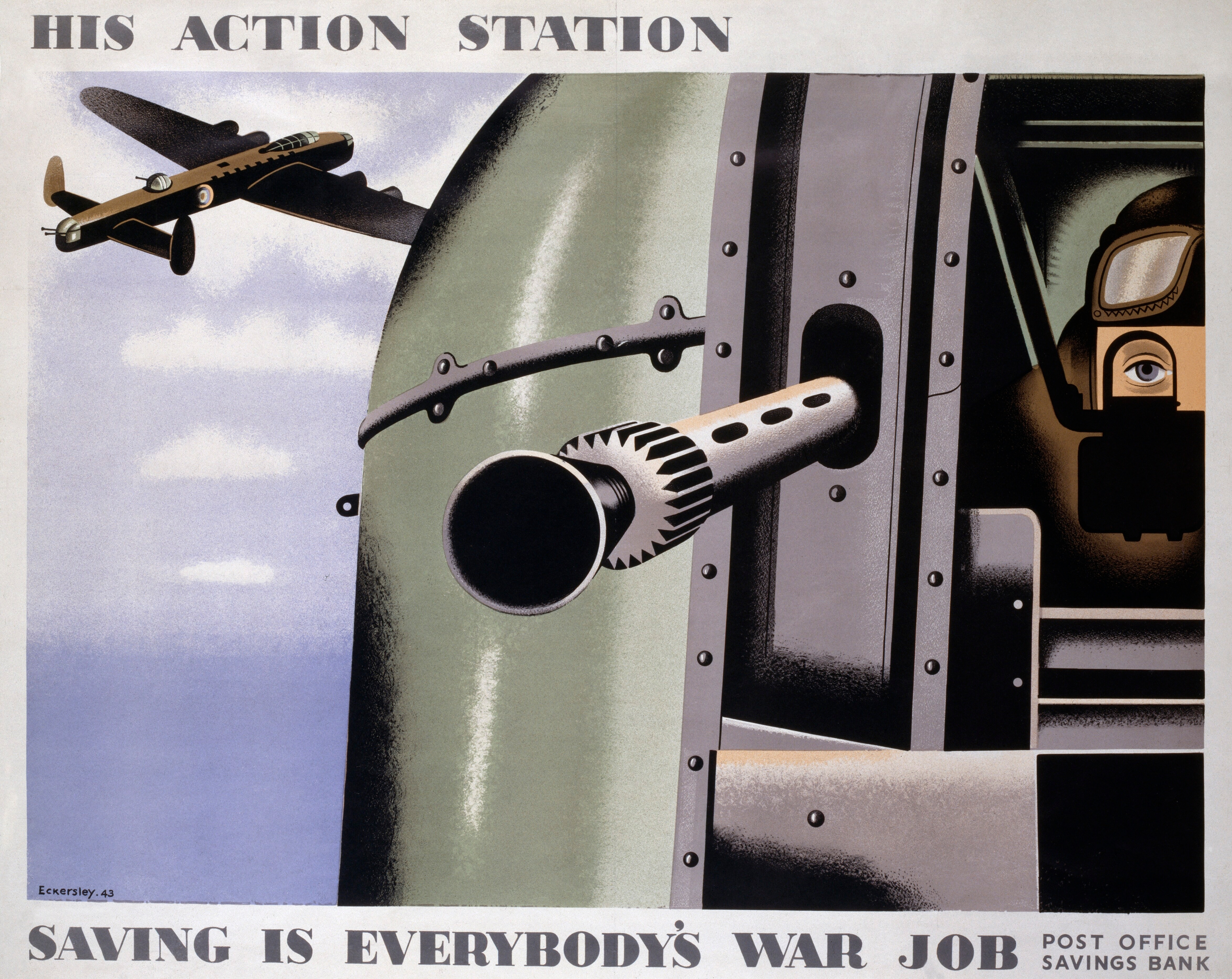
"Action station" 1943

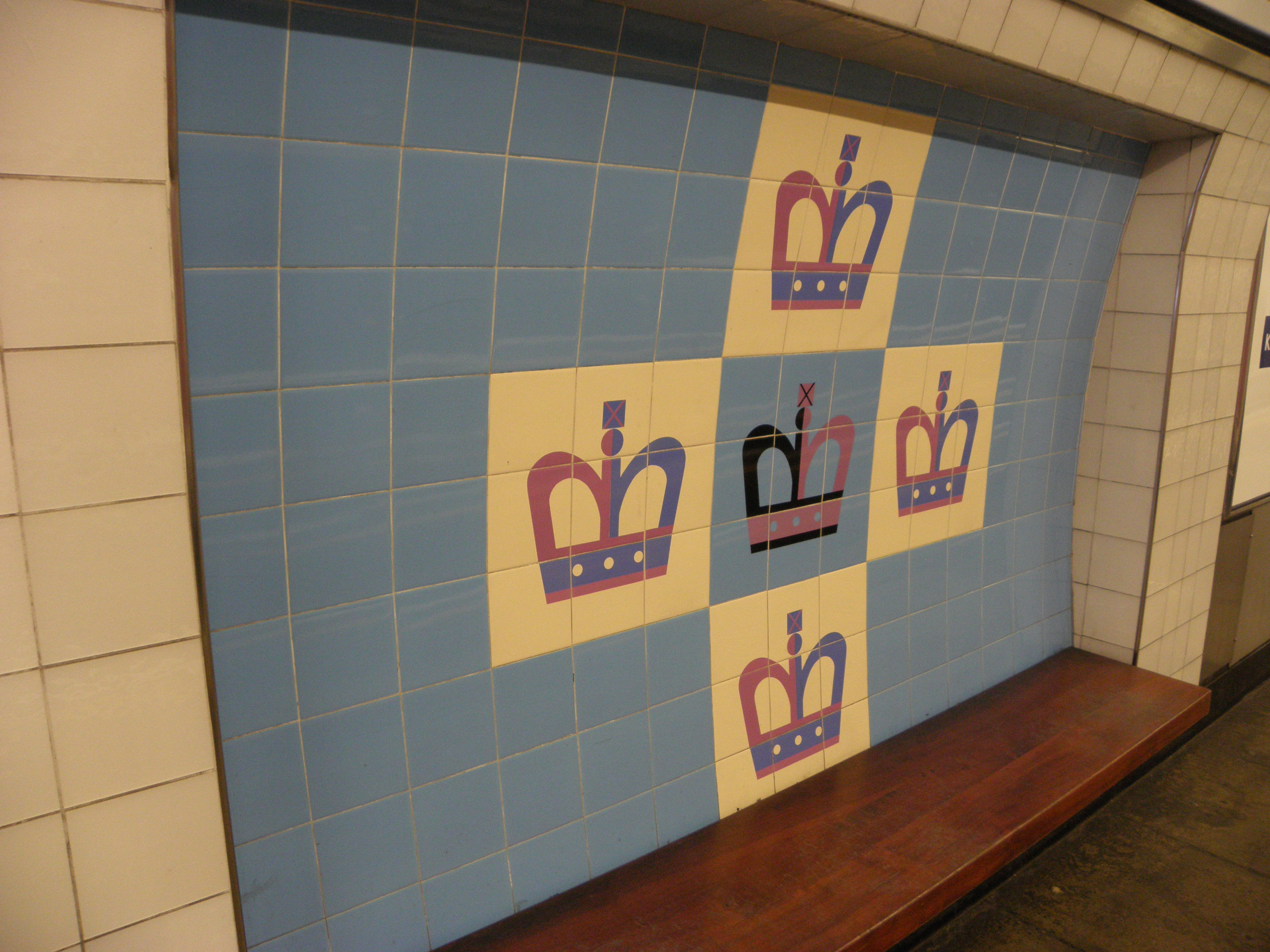
Eckersley artwork on the Victoria line

== Eckersley's archive and later life ==
Tom Eckersley retained copies of many of his posters and examples of his original artwork; these form the equivalent of sketches for the working poster maker. Eckersley used these when teaching, as well as a personal reference. The posters were kept at his home and as such formed a working archive. In addition to retaining examples of his published posters Eckersley also produced and retained posters that he had designed purely for personal enjoyment, such as a series of film posters that depicted the faces of Hollywood movie greats that were only published on a small scale for events like exhibitions of his work.

Eckersley died in 1997, two years after a retrospective of his work was exhibited at the London College of Communication, this was complemented by a written review that credits Eckersley as having transformed graphic design in the UK.

A collection at the University of the Arts London includes posters from throughout his career, magazine covers and original artwork. The University has made the posters available online on VADS (Visual Arts Data Service).

== See also ==
- Richard Eckersley (his son)
