= L'Architecture d'Aujourd'hui =

French architecture magazine

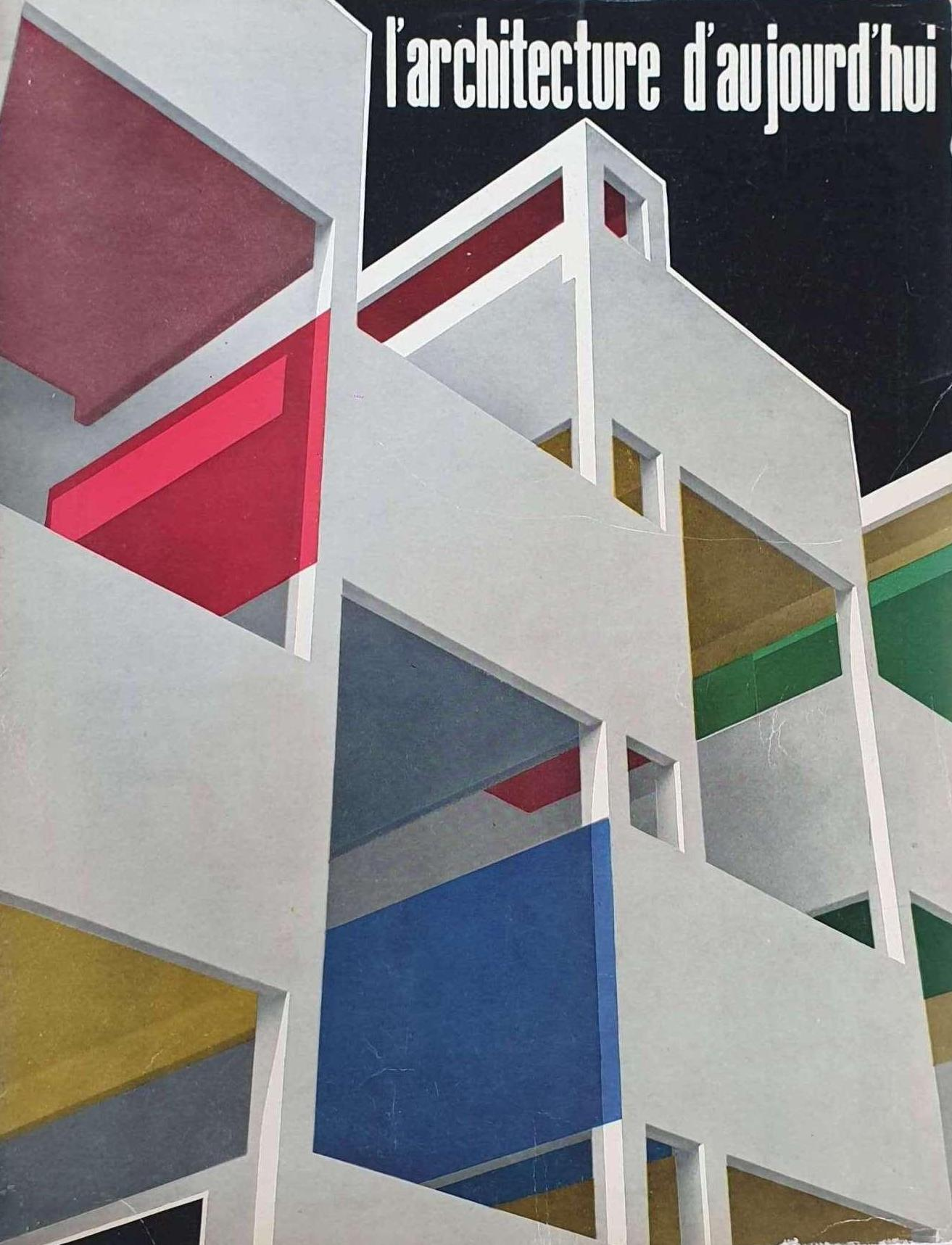
- Nid d'Abeille of Carrières Centrales in Casablanca on the cover of the December 1954 cover of L'Architecture d'Aujourd'hui.
- Categories: Architecture
- Founder: André Bloc and Marcel Eugène Cahen
- Founded: 1930
- First issue: October 1, 1930; 95 years ago
- Country: France
- Language: French

L'Architecture d'Aujourd'hui ("The Architecture of Today") is a French architecture magazine associated with the Modernist movement.

== History ==
=== Beginning ===
The magazine was founded by André Bloc et Marcel Eugène Cahen in 1930 at the beginning of the recession in Europe. The latter died just before the magazine's first issue released November 1930. Its headquarters were at 5, rue Bartholdi in Boulogne. André Bloc (1896-1966) was trained as an engineer, though he was interested in modernism and architecture.

The magazine released 10 issues annually until 1934, when it started to release 12 issues annually. Pierre Vago, a Hungarian, joined in the 1930s and was influential in developing the magazine's network of international correspondents. The magazine offered a variety of subscription types, and achieved rapid success.

In addition to its publications, L'Architecture d'Aujourd'hui organized trips, international meetings, and exhibitions. The first international trip, open to architects and architecture enthusiasts who showed interest, was to the Soviet Union in 1931. The goal of these trips was to see the architecture and establish contacts with architects in the area. During these trips, there were days of discussion to facilitate ideas; they were called Rencontres Internationales des Architects (RIA) and were organized by the magazine's correspondent in each location.

=== World War II ===
As André Bloc was Jewish, he could no longer manage the magazine during World War II. André Hermant became editor of the magazine after it was purchased by M. Georges Massé June 1941. Hermant and Massé chose a new name for the magazine: Techniques et Architectures. Upon the liberation of France, Bloc attempted to regain control of the magazine, but was unsuccessful. He had to start from scratch in competition against Techniques et Architectures.

The first issues of Bloc's reborn L'Architecture d'Aujourd'hui came out in 1945. Up until 1949, he released 5 thematic issues annually, one of which was a double issue. The magazine quickly achieved international success again. After the war, Pierre Vago restarted the Rencontres Internationales des Architects. The group was organized as the International Union of Architects in 1948.
