= Johannes Hendricus Jurres =

Dutch painter

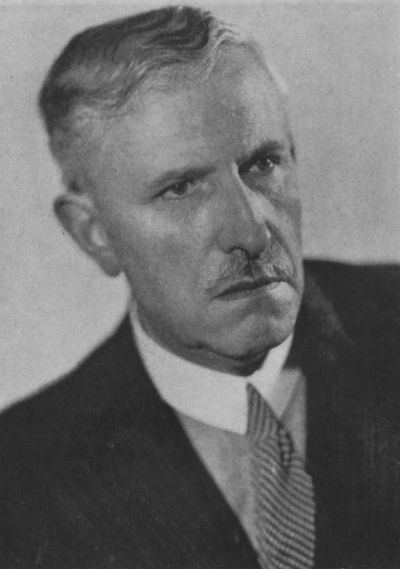
Johannes Hendricus Jurres, 1931

Johannes Hendricus Jurres (1875–1946) was a Dutch painter who was compared to Rembrandt, Velazquez and Rubens during his lifetime. He was one of the most influential painters of the interwar period.

Jurres was born into a Catholic family and was inspired by Catholic art, particularly Neuville and Doré, and military drills from a young age. At age 15 he went to Amsterdam to get a higher education in the arts. Here he became a big fan of the stories of Cervantes, Diego Hurtado, Mendoza, and Alain-René, which would inspire him to travel in later years.

He first met with success when a series of illustrations of Cervantes' Don Quixote was published in an edition of that work. During this time he became acquainted with the works of Rembrandt, Rubens and Velazquez, who would particularly influence his style; eventually Jurres' skill and style earned him a place alongside those painters in the eyes of his contemporaries. In 1921 Jurres becomes a professor at the Rijksakedemie.

His work was included in the 1939 exhibition and sale Onze Kunst van Heden (Our Art of Today) at the Rijksmuseum in Amsterdam. Jurres' work is on display in the Rijksmuseum, Fries Museum, Dordrechts Museum and Singer in Laren.
