= Liu Ye (artist) =

Chinese painter (born 1964)

- Born: Beijing, China
- Education: Central Academy of Fine Arts; Berlin University of the Arts
- Known for: Contemporary Art, painting
- Notable work: Qi Baishi Knows Mondrian , Once Upon a Time in Broadway

Liu Ye (simplified Chinese: 刘野; traditional Chinese: 劉野; pinyin: Liú Yě; born in 1964) is a Beijing-based contemporary Chinese painter known for his bright-hued paintings of childlike female figures, his favorite cartoon character Miffy the bunny and works inspired by Piet Mondrian. Liu Ye is part of a generation of artists who grew up during the Cultural Revolution. However, unlike most acclaimed Chinese contemporary art, his works have little political implications. Instead, he prefers to use a universal language to depict his inner world. His work has been exhibited extensively in China, Europe and the United States.

== Early life ==
Liu Ye was born and raised in Beijing. His father was an author of children's books, who was compelled to spend much of his time working in countryside under Mao Zedong's Down to the Countryside Movement, kept many banned books hidden away in a black chest under his bed, including Hans Christian Andersen's fairy tales, tales by Alexander Pushkin, Anna Karenina, War and Peace, Journey to the West and The Water Margin. All those books and their illustrations influence Liu Ye's art continuously. From early on, Liu Ye demonstrated interest and talent in drawing. At the age of 10, Liu's father introduced him to Tan Quanshu, who became his first official art teacher. Since then, Liu took drawing lessons with Tan once or twice a week for five years, which was a significant period of time when he mastered basic artistic techniques. At 13, Liu Ye paused studying art temporarily because his left eye was found with amblyopia and the doctor believed that would affect his sense of space as an artist. But he did not give up his dream to be an artist and his amblyopia does not seem to destruct his art works.

== Education ==
In 1980, Liu Ye applied for the Interior Design department at the School of Arts & Crafts in Beijing but eventually enrolled in the Industrial Design department where he started to learn about western modern art. For the first time, he was introduced to the teachings of the Bauhaus and the works of Piet Mondrian, who became his art hero later on. In 1984, after graduating from the School of Arts & Crafts, Liu Ye worked for the research center at Beijing Gongmei (arts and crafts) Group and prepared for college entry exam at the same time. In 1986, Liu Ye enrolled in the Mural Painting department at the Central Academy of Fine Arts with an outstanding academic score. It was a time when college students in China grew enthusiasm about psychology and philosophy, especially about works by Freud. Liu was also inspired by The Interpretation of Dream and other books by Friedrich Nietzsche and Hendrik van Loon. During his time at the Central Academy of Fine Arts, Liu Ye often drew comic strips and published them in newspaper for some income. In 1989, before graduating from the Central Academy of Fine Arts, Liu Ye travelled to Germany and passed the entry exam of Berlin University of the Arts, where he finished his undergraduate study and received his MFA in 1994. In 1998, he joined the Artist-in-residence at Rijksacademie in Amsterdam where he further developed his skills and in 2001, he had an internship at Delfina studio Trust in London. all

== Art work ==
Liu Ye's interest in Western art and his experience studying in Berlin distinguishes him from many of his contemporary Chinese artists who have turned their art as a weapon against the Communist Regime after the Tiananmen Square protest in 1989. As the art historian Pi Li says,"The major difference between him and his contemporaries was that he did not go through the period of rage around 1989 [following the Tiananmen Square massacre], nor did his works contain elements of 'collective' images." Around the same period of time, Liu Ye was witnessing the change in Europe as the Berlin Wall came down, touring Europe's art museums and studying masters of Western modernism like Paul Klee and Johannes Vermeer. Instead of focusing on his Chinese origin, Liu Ye embraces some more universal themes like beauty, feeling and hope in his works. As he puts it, "Seeking beauty is the last chance for human beings. It is like shooting at the goal; it arouses an emotion that is wild with joy."

By the time Liu Ye went back to China in 1994, his works were deeply influenced by German Expressionism, showing intense personal expression with an overall gloomy tone. The works by Mondrian as a symbol and the Mondrian composition had already appeared in a lot of his work. Mirror, his self-portray, and the surrealism of René Magritte are other important indicators of his early work. During this period, Liu started to depict a little scenario in each of his work, which continues to be one of his recognizable styles.

After 1994, as Liu Ye returned to Beijing, his style and subject matters changed with the environment. He started to portray himself more as a little boy than a young man as he did before. More female figures appeared. The settings of his painting moved from rooms to theatres where scenes he saw in China as a little boy, his childhood dream were depicted. Chorus, fleet and sailor boys were repetitive subjects portrayed during the period. His preference for using primary colors can be traced to his childhood days in Beijing as well. "I grew up in a world of red", he recalls, "the red sun, red flags, red scarves with green pines and sunflowers often supporting the red symbols".

By 2000, Liu ye had gradually developed his own distinguishable style. From 2000, Liu ye moved his attention away from himself and started to portray figures he has interest in such as Eileen Chang, Ruan Lingyu, Andersen, Little Mermaid, and so on. At the same time, he started to paint his favorite cartoon character Miffy the bunny as a reflection of himself. Liu Ye fell in love with the cartoon character created by Dick Bruna immediately after he first saw her while he was living in Amsterdam because he saw himself in the bunny, who is seemingly simple but actually extremely intelligent. The Mondrian symbol returned to his work, usually portrayed together with a little girl or boy, sometimes with Miffy as well.

Around 2004 and 2005, Liu Ye's fairytale-like fantasy was replaced by a more mild and realistic style. An adolescent girl is featured repetitively. Some paintings depict her engaging in rather simple activities such reading or embarking on a journey while others contain subtle sexual implications. Vermeer's influence became increasingly obvious in those works with the evidence of his pursuit of the perfection of human beauty.

In 2013, Liu Ye's painting Sword was sold for HK$42.68m at Sotheby’s Hong Kong. In 2019, his painting Smoke (2001-2002) was sold for a new record price of HK$52.18m (US$6.65m) at Sotheby's Hong Kong. Smoke is the first painting from a trinity of epic crimson-hued horizontal canvases from 2001-2002, the second of which resides in the esteemed M+ Sigg Collection and the third in an eminent private collection after fetching the artist’s auction record in 2013.

== Exhibitions ==
2013 Liu Ye, Johnen Galerie, Berlin, Germany (solo)

2012 Modern@MoDeng, Gallery Hotel, Beijing, China Lightness, Iberia Center for Contemporary Art, Beijing, China Bamboo Bamboo Broadway, Sperone Westwater, New York, USA Art for the Masses, Red Star Gallery, Beijing, China In Time - 2012 Chinese Oil Painting Biennale, The National Art Museum of China, Beijing, China Faces, Minsheng Art Museum, Shanghai, China

2011 10th Anniversary of Soka Art Beijing, Soka Art Center, Beijing, China Print-Concept: The Second Academic Exhibition of Chinese Contemporary Prints, Today Art Museum, Beijing, China Portraits, Eastation Gallery, Beijing, China Exhibition of Fine Art Artist Prints, S.O Art Space, Shanghai, China China Contemporary Prints Exhibition, M-Space, Shanghai, China

2010 China. Real? - ArtChina Gallery, Hamburg, Germany Fabrique en Chine - Chinese Artists Group Exhibition - Beyond Art Space, Beijing, China Think Pink - Gavlak Gallery, Palm Beach, USA Restoration: Contemporary Collotype Print Exhibition (group) - Millenium Gallery, Beijing, China Clouds: Power of Asian Contemporary Art - Soka Art Center, Beijing, China Passion Fruits Picked from the Olbright Collection - Me Collectors Room, Berlin, Germany

2009 In the Mood for Paper, Art Gallery, Beijing Liu Ye: Leave Me in the Dark (solo) - Sperone Westwater, New York, USA Normality: 2009 Art Works Show - Fine Arts Literature Art Center, Wuhan, China Related to the Context: Contemporary Painting Exhibition - Found Museum, Beijing, China

2008 China macht Druck. Zeitgenössische Chinesische Druckgrafik, Städtische Galerie Bietigheim – Bissingen Crouching Paper, Hidden Dragon - Works on Paper, F2 Gallery, Beijing China Macht Druck, Stadtische Galerie, Bietigheim-Bissingen, Germany

2007 Liu Ye - Solo Exhibition, Johnen & Schöttle, Cologne, Germany RE-collection - A Retrospective Look at 15 years of Art and Vision, Schoeni Art Gallery, Hong Kong Time Difference, Initial Access Frank Cohen Collection, Wolverhampton, UK Chinese Window, Kunstmuseum Bern, Bern, Switzerland (solo)

2006 Temptations, Sperone Westwater, New York, USA (solo) Mahjong Contemporary Chinese Art from the Sigg collection, Hamburger Kunsthalle, Hamburg, Germany The First Chinese Contemporary Arts Annual Exhibition, China Millennium Monument Art Museum, Beijing, China

2005 Liu Ye / Kaneda Shoich, Gallery Frank Schlag & Cie. GmbH, Essen, Germany Vehicle & Mirror, Beijing New Art Projects, Beijing, China Project room / Tomio Koyama Gallery, Tokyo, Japan (solo) Mahjong Contemporary Chinese Art from the Sigg collection, Kunstmuseum Bern, Bern, Switzerland

2004 Red Yellow Blue, Schoeni Art Gallery, Hong Kong (solo) Fiction @ Love, Museum of Contemporary Art, Taipei, Taiwan Dreaming of the Dragon's nation, Irish Museum of Modern Art, Dublin, Ireland Stone Face, Shanghai Duolun Museum of Modern Art, Shanghai, China

2003 Red Yellow Blue, Schoeni Art Gallery, Beijing, China (solo) Images of Women VIII, Schoeni Art Gallery, Hong Kong Left Hand, Right Hand, 798 Space Art & Culture Co. Ltd., Beijing, China A Bulimic Rhapsody, Tongdao Studio of 798 Factory, Beijing, China ChinArt, Ludwig Museum, Budapest, Hungary ChinArt, Museo d'Arte Contemporanea di Roma, Rome, Italy Lifetime, Beijing Tokyo Art Projects, Beijing, China

2002 Poster design of Contemporary Artists, Red Gate Gallery Beijing, China The Beauty of Screen, Today Gallery, Beijing, China Paris-Pekin, Espace Pierre Cardin, Paris, France ChinArt, Museum Kuppersmuehle fur Moderne Kunst, Duisburg, Germany Small Panels Show, Schoeni Art Museum, Beijing, China The First Guanghouw Trienal, Guangdong Art Museum, Guangzhou, China Beijing Inaugural Exhibition, Schoeni Art Gallery III, Beijing, China Chinese Contemporary Art, Reykjavic Art Museum, Iceland Boys from Beijing, Chinese Contemporary Ltd., London, England

2001 Fellini, A Guardsman, Mondrian, The Pope and My Girlfriend, Chinese Contemporary Gallery, London, England (solo) The First Chengdu Biennale, Chengdu, China Chinese Mythology, Yidian Gallery, Shanghai, China First impression, Yibo Gallery, Shanghai, China Transparence / Opacity, De Markten, Brussels, Belgium Undo, Aura gallery, Shanghai, China Graphix & Comix in China, Canvas International Art, Amsterdam, the Netherlands

2000 A Selection From Collection, Shanghai Art Museum, Shanghai, China Liu Ye and Mao Yan, Mao Yan, Chinese Contemporary London, England Galerie Lococo Mulder, Berlin, Germany (solo)

1999 Liberation, Chinese Contemporary London, England The 40th, China Art Gallery Berlin, Germany

1998 It's Me! -- A Profile of Chinese Contemporary Art in the 90s, traveled Beijing, China From Behind the Bamboo Curtain, LUMC Gallery Leiden\Chinese Invitational Exhibition, Liu Haisu Gallery Shanghai Mondrian in China, Art Gallery of the International Palace in Beijing, China

1997 Made in China, Gallery Serieuse Zaken Amsterdam, the Netherlands Ming Jing Di Gallery Beijing, China (solo)

1995 Gallery Taube Berlin, Germany (solo) New Anecdotes of Social Talk, Art Gallery of International Palace, Beijing, China

1993 Gallery Taube Berlin, Germany (solo)

1991 FBK Art Exhibition, Berlin, Germany

1988 Silk Road, China Art Gallery, Beijing, China

all
