= Gerard Westermann =

Dutch artist (1880–1971)

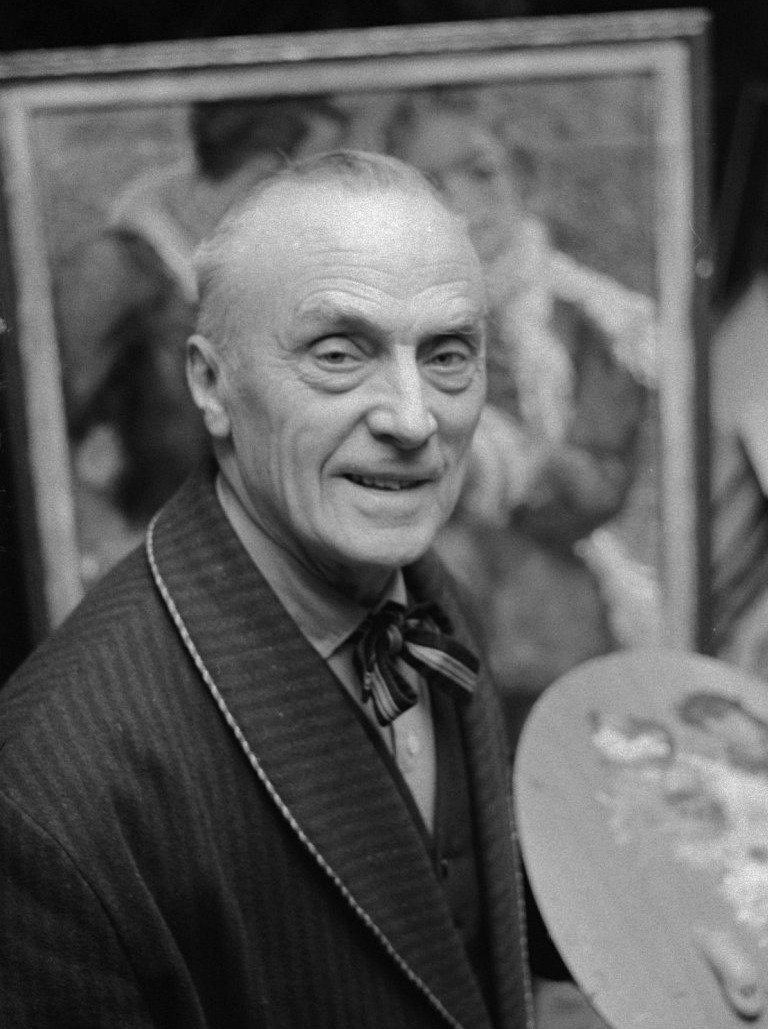
- Westermann in 1960

Medal record

Art competitions

Representing the Netherlands

Olympic Games
Bronze medal – third place	1932 Los Angeles	Watercolors and drawings

Gerhardus "Gerard" Bernardus Josephus Westermann (25 December 1880, Leeuwarden – 3 February 1971, Amsterdam) was a Dutch artist. In 1932 he won a bronze medal in the art competitions of the Olympic Games for his "Horseman". Westermann's work was included in the 1939 exhibition and sale Onze Kunst van Heden (Our Art of Today) at the Rijksmuseum in Amsterdam, which holds over 60 of his works.

== Literature ==
- The Games of the Xth Olympiad Los Angeles 1932 (PDF). Xth Olympiade Committee of the Games of Los Angeles, U.S.A. 1932. 1933. pp. 748–765. Archived from the original (PDF) on 10 April 2008.
- Wagner, Juergen. "Olympic Art Competition 1932". Olympic Games Museum. Archived from the original on 1 May 2008.
- Kramer, Bernhard (May 2004). "In Search of the Lost Champions of the Olympic Art Contests" (PDF). Journal of Olympic History. 12 (2): 29–34. Archived from the original (PDF) on 10 April 2008.
- Evans, Hilary; Gjerde, Arild; Heijmans, Jeroen; Mallon, Bill; et al. "Gerard Westermann". Olympics at Sports-Reference.com. Sports Reference LLC. Archived from the original on 4 December 2013.
