= Groupe Espace =

French avant-garde artistic movement

Groupe Espace was a French avant-garde artistic movement between 1951 and 1960. The group was founded by architect André Bloc in 1951 and members associated with the journal Art d'Aujourd'hui (Art Today). Their purpose was to create a new environment appropriate to modern society. They envisaged art as a social phenomenon, not an individual one.

Members of the group included Jean Dewasne, Jean Gorin, Jean Messagier, Jean Le Moal, Edgard Pillet, Erno Goldfinger, Walter Gropius, Marcel Breuer, Frits Glamer, Gianni Monnet, Gualtiero Nativi, Nicolaas Warb and Nicolas Schöffer.

There was also the London Branch of Groupe Espace from 1953 to 1959, founded by Paule Vézelay.

== Purpose of the group ==
"Espace" means "space" in French, and the group was interested in promoting art located in the physical and social environment. A second meaning of the word was concerned with space as a compositional element "by which space within a three-dimensional art work allowed for its penetration by light."

Groupe Espace sought to break away from traditional artistic conventions and explore new forms of expression, particularly in abstract art. Groupe Espace was influenced by various avant-garde movements of the time, including Constructivism, Abstract Expressionism and Art Informel.

Piet Mondrian wrote in his 1937 essay "Plastic Art and Pure Plastic Art (Figurative Art and Non-Figurative Art)" published in the book CIRCLE: "Art will not only continue but will realize itself more and more. By the unification of architecture, sculpture, and painting, a new plastic reality will be created. Painting and sculpture will not manifest themselves as separate objects, nor as 'mural art' which destroys architecture itself, nor as 'applied' art, but being purely constructive will aid the creation of a surrounding not merely utilitarian or rational but also pure and complete in its beauty". In this essay, as the title implies, "plastic" art is "figurative" and "objective"; whereas "pure plastic" art is "non-figurative" and "subjective".

== History ==
André Bloc (1896–1966) graduated as an engineer and later became an architect. He founded the journal L'Architecture d'Aujourdhui [Architecture Today] in 1930, and began sculpting in the 1940s. In 1949 he founded the journal Art d'Aujourd'hui (Art Today), which merged with L'Architecture d'Aujourdhui in 1954 to become Aujourdhui [Today].

Bloc's artistic output included painting, sculpture, architecture, mosaics, furniture, textile designs and screen prints. He had a life-long interest in Constructivism that pre-dated his own transition from figuration to abstraction in 1945. This Constructivist synthesis of artistic disciplines is reflected in his 1936 book L'Union pour L'Art [The Union of Art].

Groupe Espace was formed at a meeting in the Grand Palais in Paris, on 17 October 1951. This initial meeting was largely attended by architects, painters, sculptors and neoplasticists. "Bloc's opening address connected Groupe Espace to the Constructivist tradition and drew a parallel between the aims of the group and those of the pre-war De Stijl and Bauhaus movements." The meeting endorsed a Manifesto, an English translation of which can be found by Jeffrey Steele in Appendix A of Alan Fowler's PhD thesis.
