= Typographica =

British journal (1949–1967)

Typographica was the name of a journal of typography and visual arts founded and edited by Herbert Spencer from 1949 to 1967. Spencer was just 25 years old when the first Typographica was issued. He also served as the designer of the journal.

Typographica was produced in two series: the "Old Series" and the "New Series". Each series was published in sixteen issues.

== See also ==
- Watching Words Move, by Ivan Chermayeff and Tom Geismar, Chronicle Books, 2006. (ISBN 978-0-8118-5214-2) – This book was developed from the insert in Typographica 6 (New Series).
