= AFAS Live =

Concert hall in Amsterdam, Netherlands

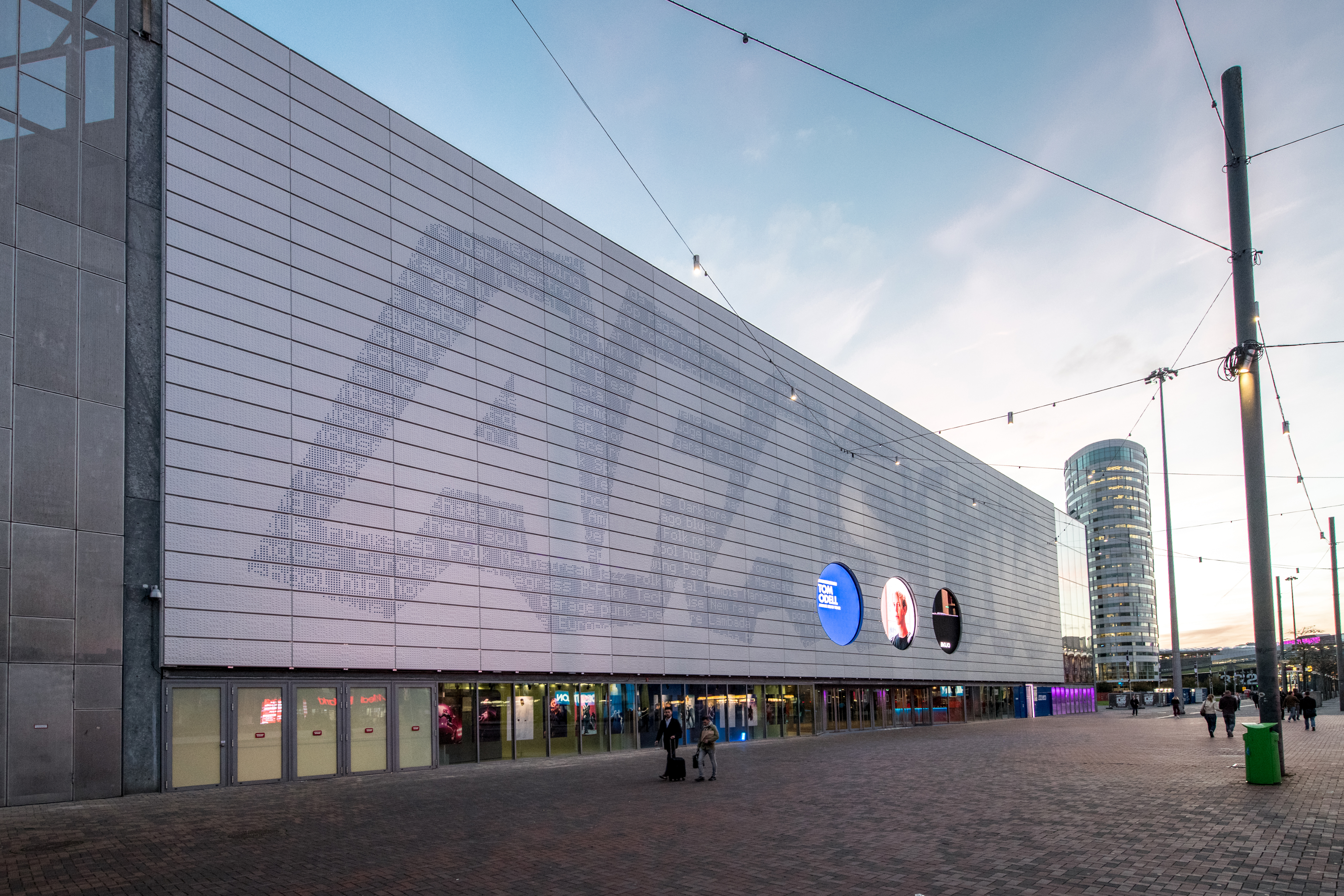
- Interactive map of AFAS Live
- Former names: Heineken Music Hall (2001–2016)
- Address: Arena Boulevard 590; 1101 DS Amsterdam; Netherlands
- Location: Amsterdam-Zuidoost
- Coordinates: 52.3120°N 4.9444°E
- Owner: Government of Amsterdam
- Operator: Live Nation
- Capacity: 6,000

Construction
- Built: 1996–2001
- Opened: 1 February 2001
- Cost: €30 million
- Architect: Frits van Dongen

Website
- www.afaslive.nl

AFAS Live (formerly known as the Heineken Music Hall) is a concert hall in Amsterdam, Netherlands, near the Johan Cruyff Arena. The big hall, named "Black Box" has a capacity of 6,000 and is 3000 m^{2}; a smaller hall for after parties (Beat Box) has a capacity of 700.

The venue opened in 2001 and was sponsored by Heineken until 2017. It attracts around 650,000 visitors per year.

== History ==
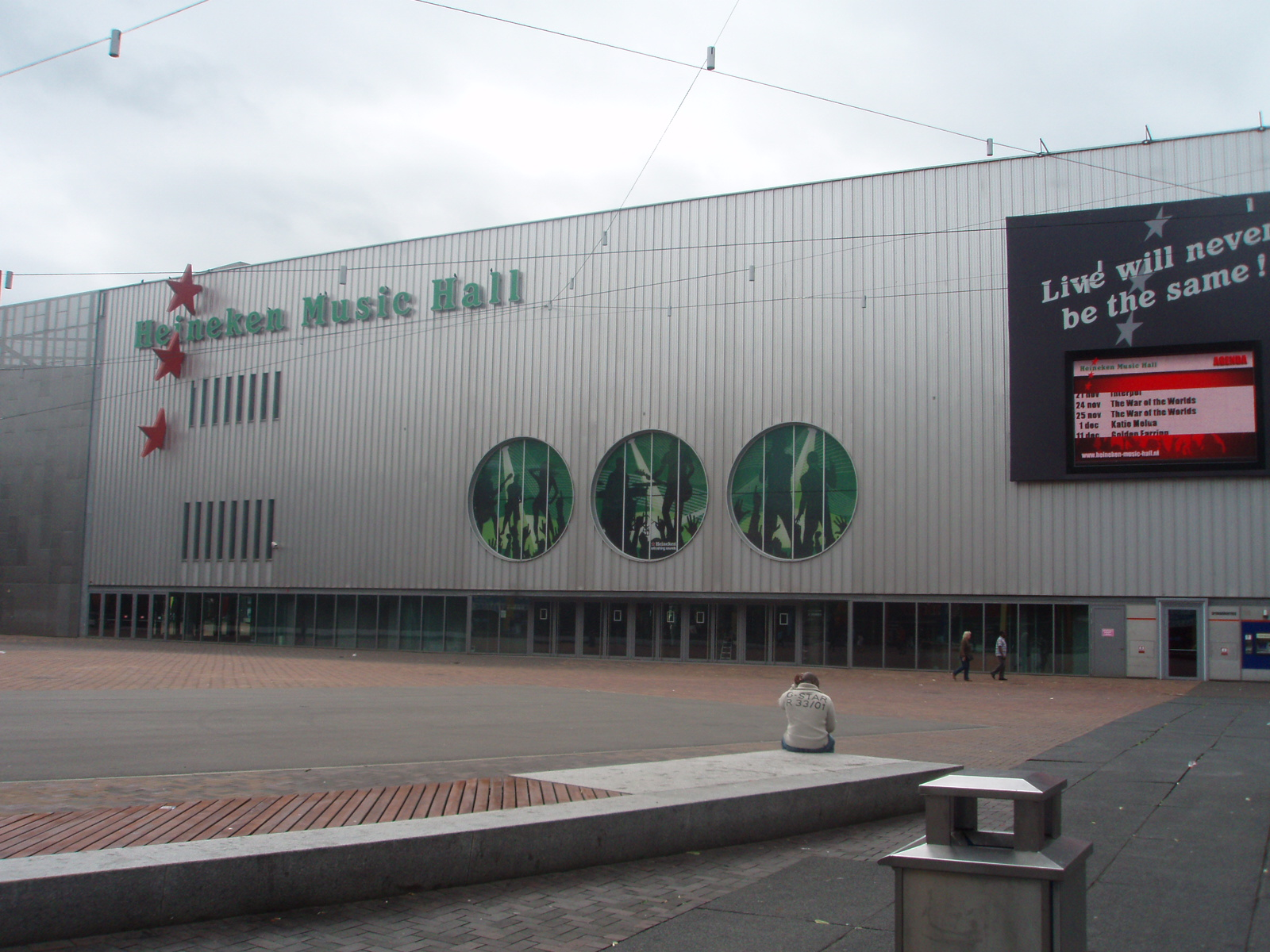
The facade as Heineken Music Hall in 2010

The venue was specially designed for amplified music by architect Frits van Dongen of Architekten Cie. The building was constructed between 1996 and 2001, and cost €30 million.

In March 2009, a concert by The Killers had to be postponed until May because of a bomb threat at a nearby IKEA.

In 2013, when Kanye West performed at the venue, he requested an all-white dressing room, including a deep pile white carpet that cost around €10,000. However, he went on stage directly from his car and did not set foot inside the dressing room once before leaving.

On 16 September 2016, it was announced that the name will be changed to AFAS Live on 1 January 2017. It is named after the venue's partner and sponsor AFAS Software BV (the acronym stands for Applications for Administrative Solutions) a business software developer in Leusden, the Netherlands with 450 employees. The name AFAS Live is spelt out on the aluminum facade with 70,000 blue caps.

== Events ==
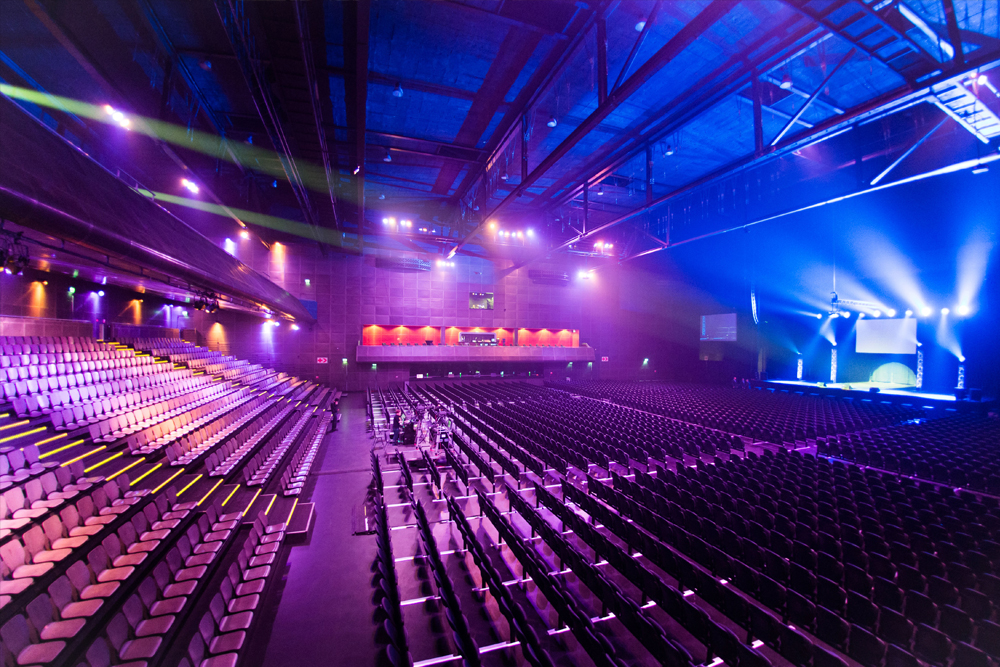
"Black Box" interior (October 2018)

Alter Bridge's Live from Amsterdam was recorded at the venue. The second concert featured in Within Temptation's live album Let Us Burn – Elements & Hydra Live in Concert was also recorded at the venue.

On 1 December 2012, AFAS Live (as Heineken Music Hall) hosted the Junior Eurovision Song Contest 2012.

On 3 March 2018, 93-year-old Charles Aznavour became the oldest person to perform at AFAS Live, in what was one of his last concerts before his death in October.

On 7 April 2019, AFAS Live hosted the first out of five promotional events for the Eurovision Song Contest. Eurovision in Concert featured 28 acts, most of which competed amongst the 41 in the Eurovision Song Contest 2019, in which the Netherlands went on to win.

On 30 October 2024, the virtual software program Hatsune Miku gave a concert at AFAS Live.
