= George Floyd protests in Germany =

2020 anti-racism protests in Germany

- Part of George Floyd protests
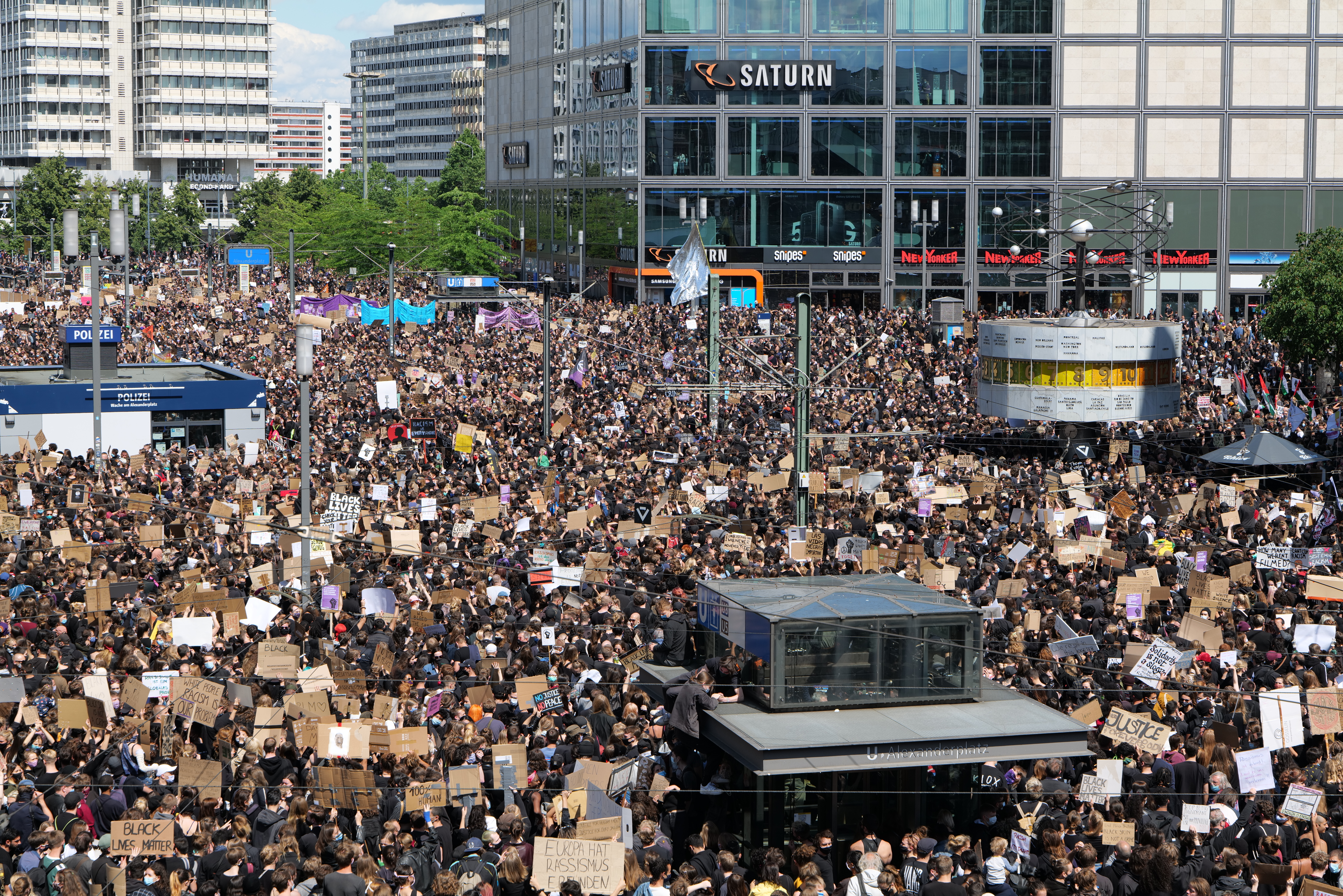
- Protestors at Alexanderplatz in Berlin
- Date: 30 May 2020 - June 2020
- Location: Germany

Cities in Germany in which a protest with about 100 or more participants was held

Shortly after protests seeking justice for George Floyd, an African American who was murdered during a police arrest, began in the United States, people in Germany formed their own demonstrations to show solidarity with the American protesters. Many also called on the German police to address its own racist practices and use of violence.

People protested in over 40 cities and in all 16 states.

== Protests ==
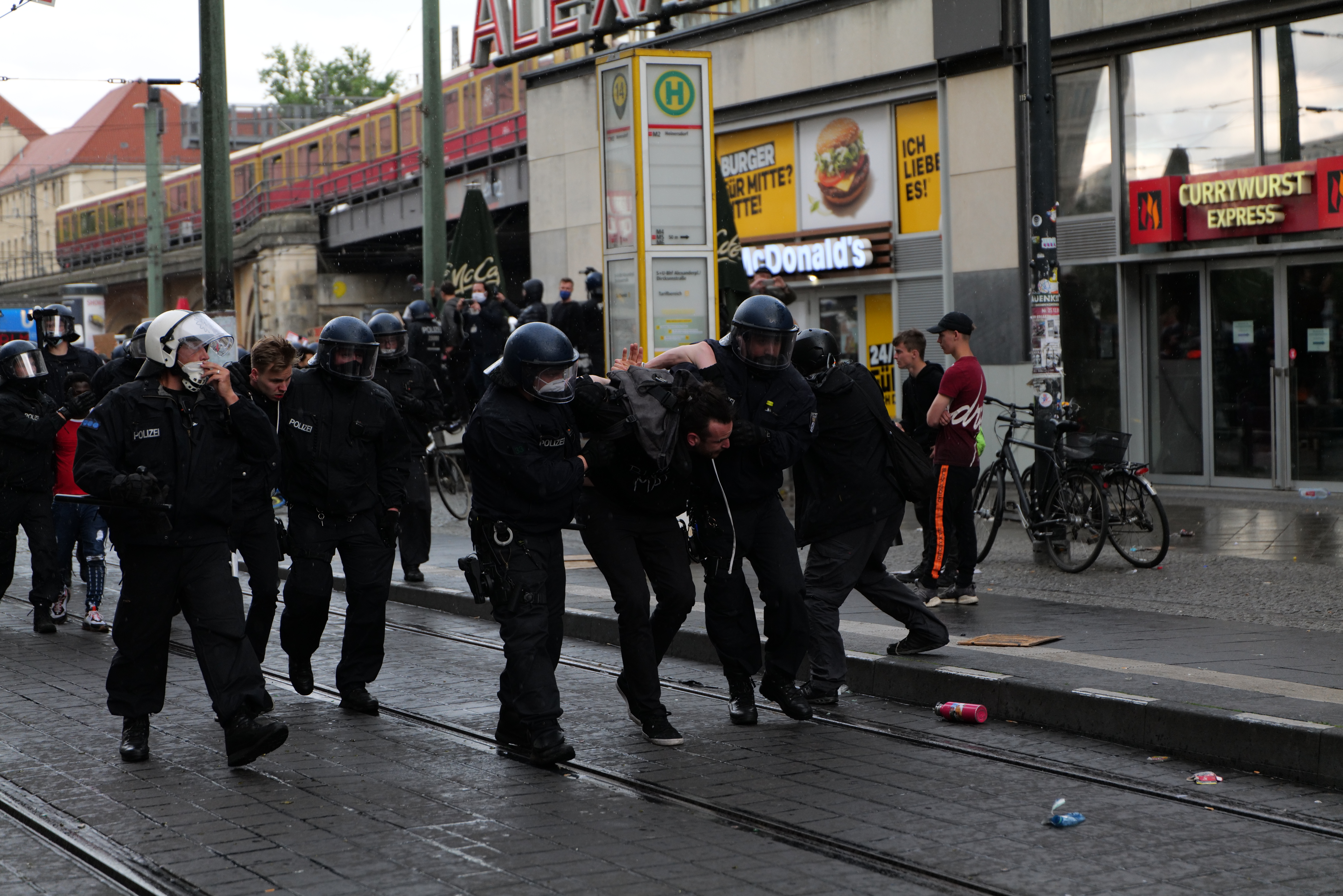
Police and protestors in Berlin

Most of the protests in Germany sparked by the murder of George Floyd were held on 6 June. On that day, in more than 30 cities the combined number of participants exceeded 100,000. In addition, 93 arrests made that day had been reported by the media, and at least two Black (Note: Source specifically uses the phrase "Black participants" in the English text, and "Schwarze Teilnehmer" in the German text.) protestors had been sent to the hospital. The local Black Lives Matter movement claimed this was due to police brutality.

=== Baden-Württemberg ===
- Freiburg im Breisgau: Around 10,000 people protested at Platz der Alten Synagoge on 6 June.
- Karlsruhe: Around 4,000 people took part at two demonstrations at Friedrichsplatz and at Schlossplatz on 6 June.
- Konstanz: Around 1,000 people protested on 6 June.
- Mannheim: Around 4,000 people protested at the Ehrenhof of Mannheim Palace on 6 June.
- Stuttgart:
  - On 6 June, a protest against police brutality and racism took place. Thousands participated in a moment of silence to remember Floyd. Minor violence sparked from some protesters.
  - The following week, in Bad Cannstatt, about 2000 people peacefully protested against racism and hate, under the motto "Solidarity with George Floyd". (Note: The original motto in German was "Solidarität mit George Floyd".) The protest was held in Bad Cannstatt to provide enough space for the practice of pandemic protocols. According to the police, social distancing was observed during the demonstration.
- Tübingen: Around 1,000 people protested at Holzmarkt on 6 June.

=== Bavaria ===
Protestors at Königsplatz in Munich

- Aschaffenburg: Around 150 people attended a protest at Theaterplatz on 6 June.
- Augsburg: More than 3,000 people protested on 6 June in the city of Augsburg.
- Munich:
  - About 350 people protested in Munich on 31 May. Protesters peacefully marched through the inner city and passed by the US Consulate.
  - On 6 June, about 25,000 people gathered at the Königsplatz.
- Nuremberg:
  - Around 300 people protested in Nuremberg on 5 June.
  - On 6 June, about 5,000 people came to protest at the Wöhrder Wiese.
- Würzburg:
  - Around 1,000 people protested on the Mainwiesen on 5 June.
  - Around 800 people protested on 6 June in the city of Würzburg.

=== Berlin ===
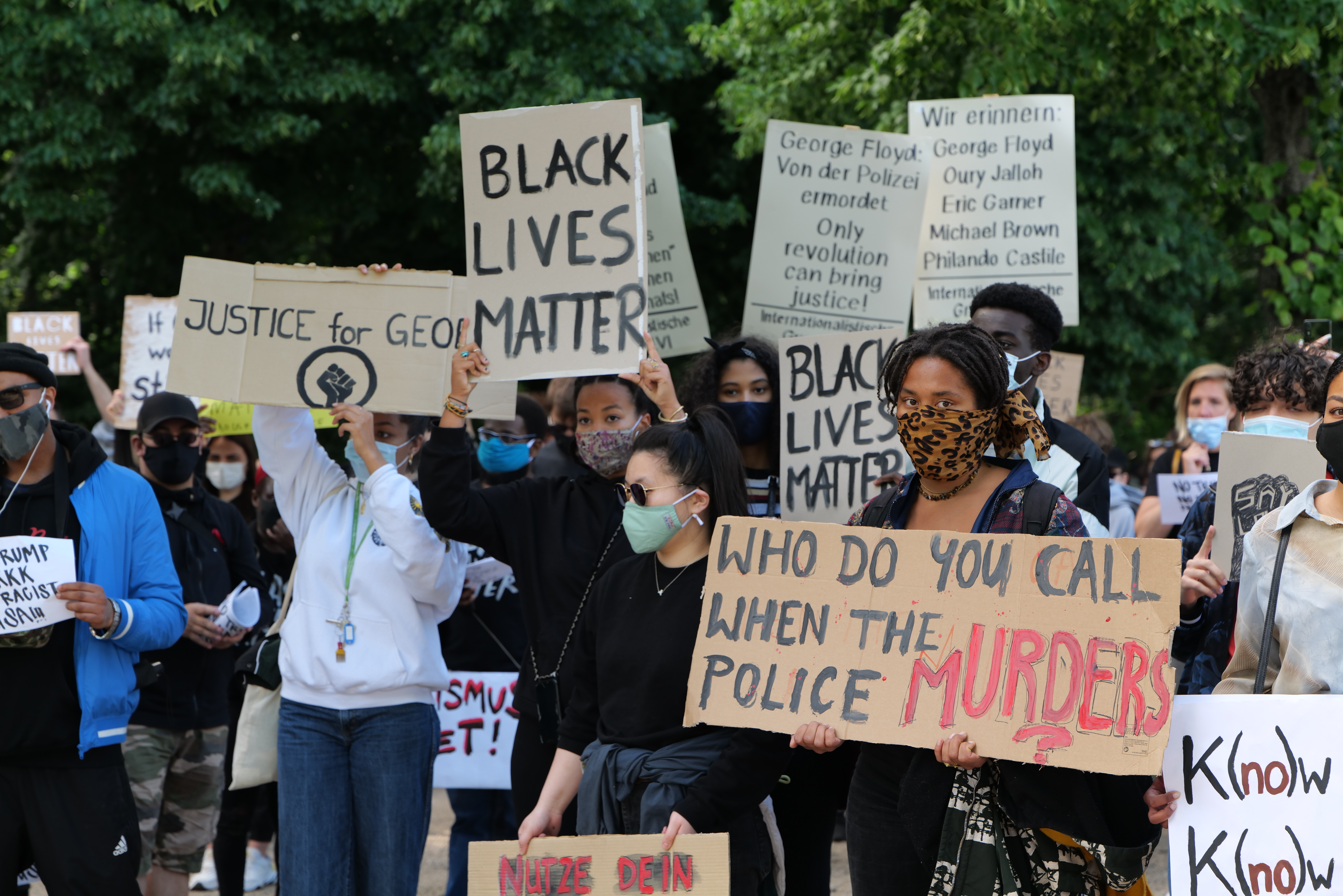
Protestors in Berlin holding up signs

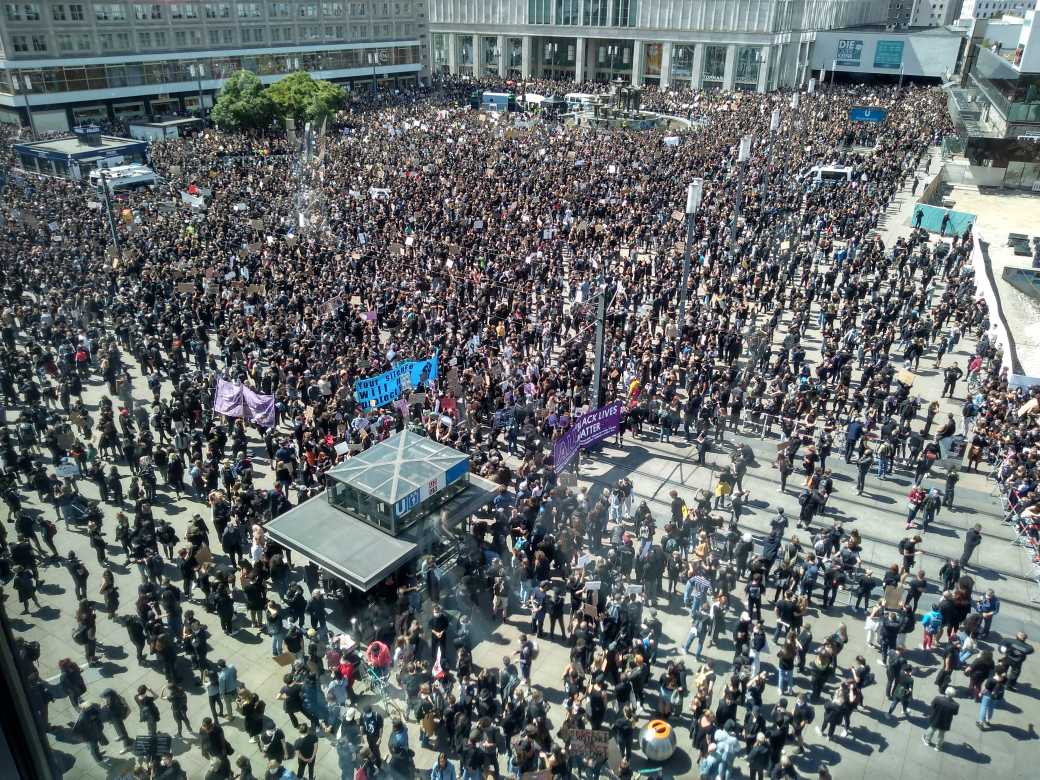
Protestors at Alexanderplatz

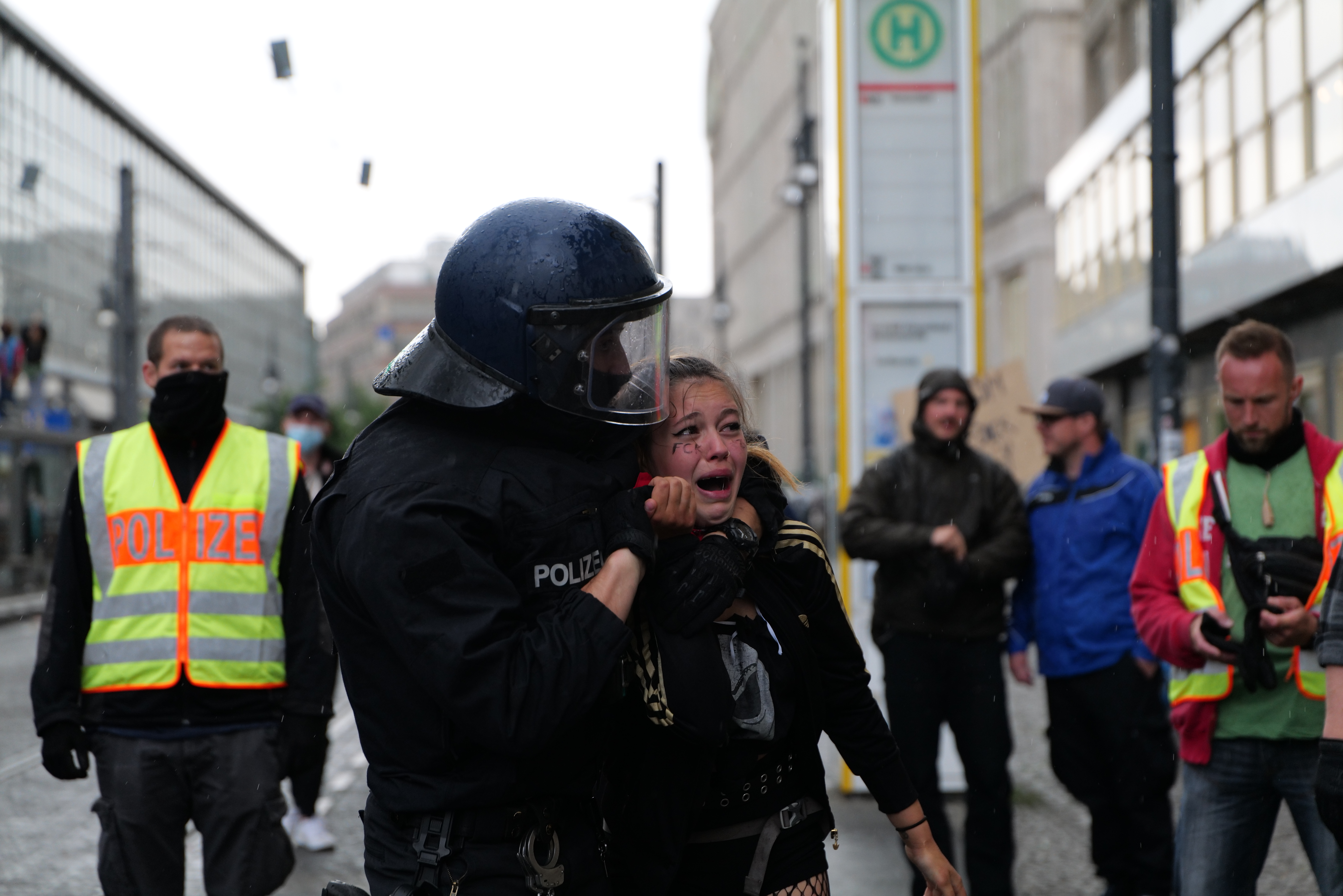
At a protest in Berlin

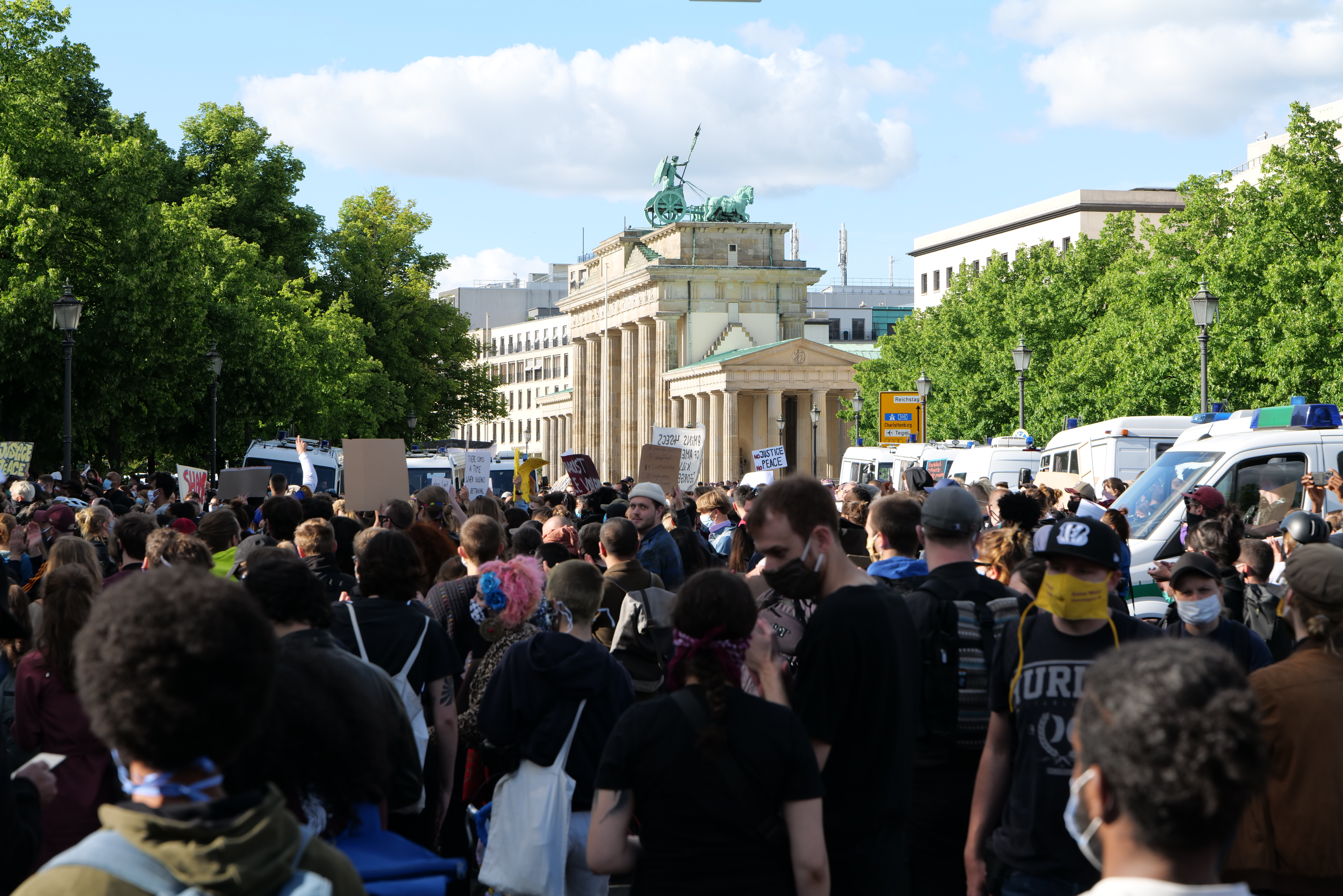
Protestors at the Brandenburg Gate

Thousands of people protested in Berlin on 30 May. Many gathered in front of the US Embassy, chanting "black lives matter." On 6 June, over 15,000 gathered at Alexanderplatz before its closure to new arrivals, joining in a protest that ended in mild violence and a currently unknown number of arrests.

=== Brandenburg ===
- Potsdam: About 50 to 60 people protested against police brutality on Brandenburger Straße in the city center. The protest was unregistered, and police were dispatched to the location.

=== Bremen ===
- Bremen: About 2,500 protesters showed up to a peaceful protest on 2 June.
- Bremerhaven: Around 200 people protested against racism in memory of Floyd. Protestors also observed 8′46″ of silence.

=== Hamburg ===
On 5 June, around 4,500 people attended a protest outside the US Consulate along the banks of the Alster River. Around 14,000 people peacefully protested on 6 June. Afterwards the police and a group of protesters clashed marginally together, up to 35 protesters were arrested.

=== Hessen ===
- Frankfurt am Main:
  - On 3 June, hundreds protested at locations in central Frankfurt.
  - On 5 June, about 3,000 showed up to the city center.
  - On 6 June, around 8,000 protested around Römer and Paulsplatz.
- Fulda: Around 2,000 people gathered Universitätsplatz on 6 June.
- Kassel: Around 3,000 people gathered in front of Kassel Hauptbahnhof on 6 June.
- Marburg: Nearly 3,000 people protested in front of Erwin-Piscator-Haus on 6 June.
- Wiesbaden: Around 500 people protested at Luisenplatz on 6 June.

=== Lower Saxony ===
- Brunswick: More than 2,000 people protested at Kohlmarkt on 6 June.
- Göttingen: About 1,750 people gathered in protest on 6 June in a largely peaceful protest.
- Hanover: More than 8,500 people protested on 6 June.
- Oldenburg: Up to 1,300 people protested at Schlossplatz on 6 June.
- Osnabrück: Approximately 2,000 protesters gathered at the city's castle for a silent protest on 6 June.

=== Mecklenburg-Western Pomerania ===
- Rostock: More than 600 people protested at Doberaner Platz on 6 June.

=== North Rhine-Westphalia ===
- Aachen: Around 500 people protested in front of the Aachen Hauptbahnhof on 7 June.
- Bielefeld: Around 600 people protested at Kesselbrink on 4 June.
- Bonn: Around 600 people protested at Münsterplatz on 6 June.
- Cologne:
  - A series of protests took place on 6 June, including one with over 10,000 attendees.
  - Around 5,000 people marched from Neumarkt to Deutzer Werft on 7 June.
- Dortmund: Around 5,000 people (4,000 stated by police) protested at Hansaplatz on 6 June.
- Duisburg: Around 300 people protested at Heinrich-König-Platz on 3 June.
- Düsseldorf: On 6 June, about 20,000 protesters marched through Düsseldorf's streets.
- Lippstadt: Around 300 people protested at Rathausplatz on 6 June.
- Münster: More than 2,000 people protested at Schlossplatz on 6 June.
- Paderborn: Around 120 people protested on 7 June.

=== Rhineland-Palatinate ===
- Kaiserslautern:
  - Around 200 people gathered at Stiftskirche on 4 June.
  - Around 80 people protested on 7 June.
- Mainz: Around 2,500 people gathered at the banks of the River Rhine on 6 June.
- Trier:
  - Around 600 people protested on 6 June.
  - A commemoration to the victims of racism with 120 people was held on 7 June.

=== Saarland ===
- Saarbrücken: 2,000 to 3,000 people protested in front of Congresshalle on 6 June.

=== Saxony ===
- Chemnitz: At least 1,500 people gathered spontaneously at Roter Turm on 6 June.
- Dresden: Around 4,000 people marched on 6 June.
- Leipzig:
  - Around 700 people protested on 6 June.
  - More than 15,000 people protested on 7 June in the city centre of Leipzig.

=== Saxony-Anhalt ===
- Magdeburg: Around 1500 people marched from Magdeburg Hauptbahnhof to Domplatz on 6 June.

=== Schleswig-Holstein ===
- Flensburg: Around 1,000 people gathered on 6 June.

=== Thuringia ===
- Jena: About 400 people protested in Jena on 2 June. They marched peacefully through the city.

== Murals ==
A mural depicting Floyd was painted in Berlin's Mauerpark, on a section of the Berlin Wall, a day after the video of Floyd's murder spread on social media.

A mural depicting Floyd had also been painted at an underpass in Mannheim's Schlossgarten.

== Response ==
=== Government ===
Chancellor Angela Merkel called the murder of George Floyd a "very very terrible thing", and also condemned racism as "something terrible". Merkel also noted that she tried "to bring people together, to seek reconciliation", but that US President Trump's "political style is a very controversial one".

Foreign Minister Heiko Maas stated that "[t]he peaceful protests that we see in the US, involving many moving gestures, including by American police officers, are understandable and more than legitimate", adding that he hoped the protests had an impact and did not turn violent.

=== Celebrities ===
Borussia Mönchengladbach football player Marcus Thuram took a knee and bowed his head for a few seconds after scoring a goal. His coach Marco Rose stated that Thuram's sign against racism was "one we all completely support of course".

Borussia Dortmund football player Jadon Sancho removed his jersey after scoring a goal to reveal a shirt with the words "Justice For George Floyd" written on it. He received a yellow card for the move.

== Federal government reaction to anti-journalist violence ==
While reporting from Minneapolis, Deutsche Welle's Stefan Simons and his crew were shot at by police in two separate incidents and threatened with arrest in a third incident.

Foreign Minister Heiko Maas, who had been made aware of the incidents, stated that "[j]ournalists must be able to carry out their task, which is independent coverage of events, without endangering their safety". He added that "[d]emocratic states under the rule of law have to meet the highest standards when it comes to protecting freedom of press", and criticized violence directed toward working journalists.

== See also ==
- Murder of George Floyd
- George Floyd protests
- List of George Floyd protests
