= Frits van Dongen =

Dutch architect (born 1946)

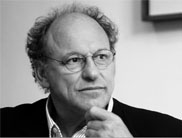
- Born: 12 March 1946 's-Hertogenbosch, North Brabant, Netherlands
- Occupation: Architect

Frits van Dongen (born 12 March 1946, in 's-Hertogenbosch) is an architect from the Netherlands. He designed a canal-side municipal theatre for the city of Leeuwarden with his firm De Architecten Cie. The building he designed that is known as The Whale is in an area known as the Oostelijke Handelskade (Eastern Docklands area) that includes "some of The Netherlands' most cutting-edge housing developments including Piraeus, designed by Hans Kollhoff and Christian Rappit, "Hoop, Liefde en Fortuin" (named after three windmills that used to dominate this area) by Rudy Uytenhaak" and one of Jamie Oliver's "Fifteen" restaurants. Rotterdam Maaskant Prize for Young Architects 2005 winner Oliver Thill and his architecture partner André Kempe, both from East Germany, both worked in van Dongen's office.

== Projects ==
- Delfts Blauw, Delft, The Netherlands, 1998
- Batavia - Entrepot - West 4, Amsterdam, the Netherlands, 2000
- Botania - Anne Frankstraat, Amsterdam, the Netherlands, 2002
- The Whale, Amsterdam, the Netherlands, 2000

== Selected publications ==
- Frits van Dongen, Ron van der Ende, Braden King. The factory set, Frame Publishers, 2015.

== See also ==
- List of Dutch architects
