= Ron van der Ende =

Dutch sculptor

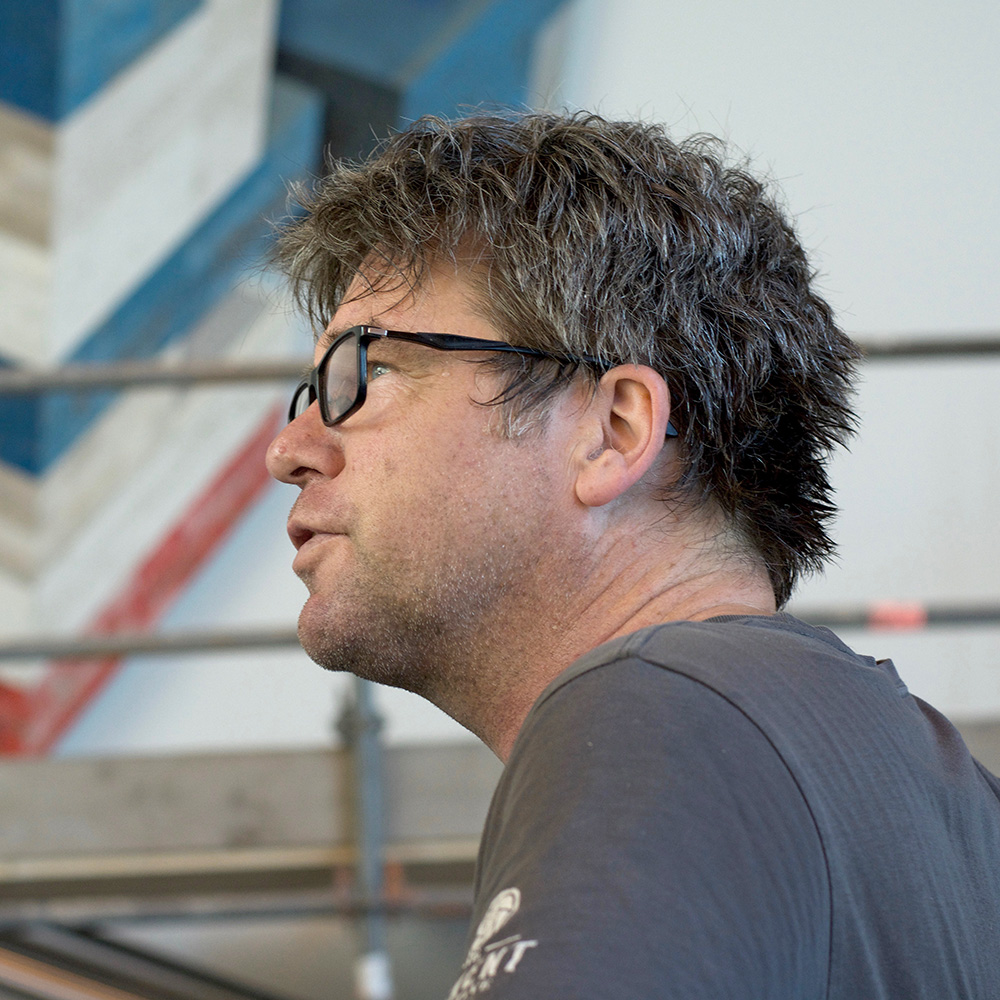
- van der Ende in 2018
- Born: 1965 (age 59–60); Delft, Netherlands
- Education: Willem de Kooning Academy
- Known for: Sculpture, installation art, video art
- Awards: WdKA Maaskantprijs 1990

Ron van der Ende (born 1965) is a Dutch visual artist who works as sculptor, installation artist and video artist. He is known for his monumental bas-reliefs, depicting objects such as cars, buildings and space capsules.

== Biography ==
Van der Ende was born in Delft in 1965 and raised in Maasdijk, Westland, where his father worked in a carpentry factory. He studied art at the Academy of Fine Arts and Technical Sciences in Rotterdam, now Willem de Kooning Academy, from 1984 to 1988. He had started studying painting, but later switched to sculpture.

After his studies in 1988 he settled as artist in Rotterdam. In the same year he co-founded the artists' collective ExpoHenK, and had his first exhibition in the Rotterdam gallery Dyonisus. In 1990, he was awarded the WdKA Maaskantprijs for a 1988 wall installation made out of six wooden objects of the same size based on historical drawings.

Van der Ende continued to construct wooden objects. In 2000, he started making his famous bas-reliefs by fixing pieces of veneer on wooden base constructions. They are made out of used wood, which usually contains the original layer of paint, such as old doors and other scrap wood.

== Gallery ==
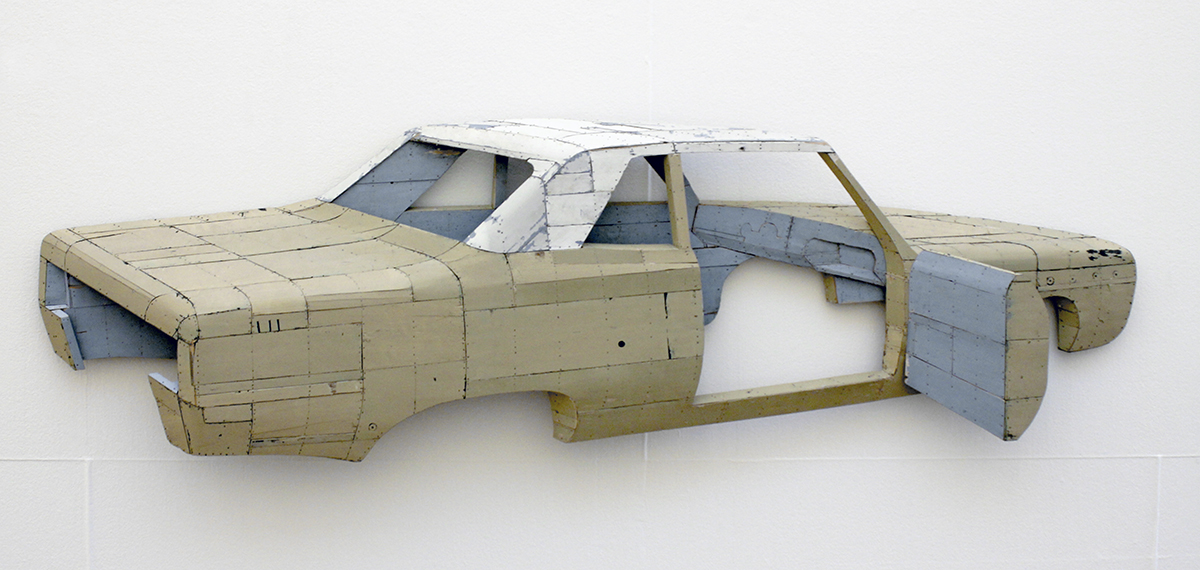
Chevelle 65 (2000)

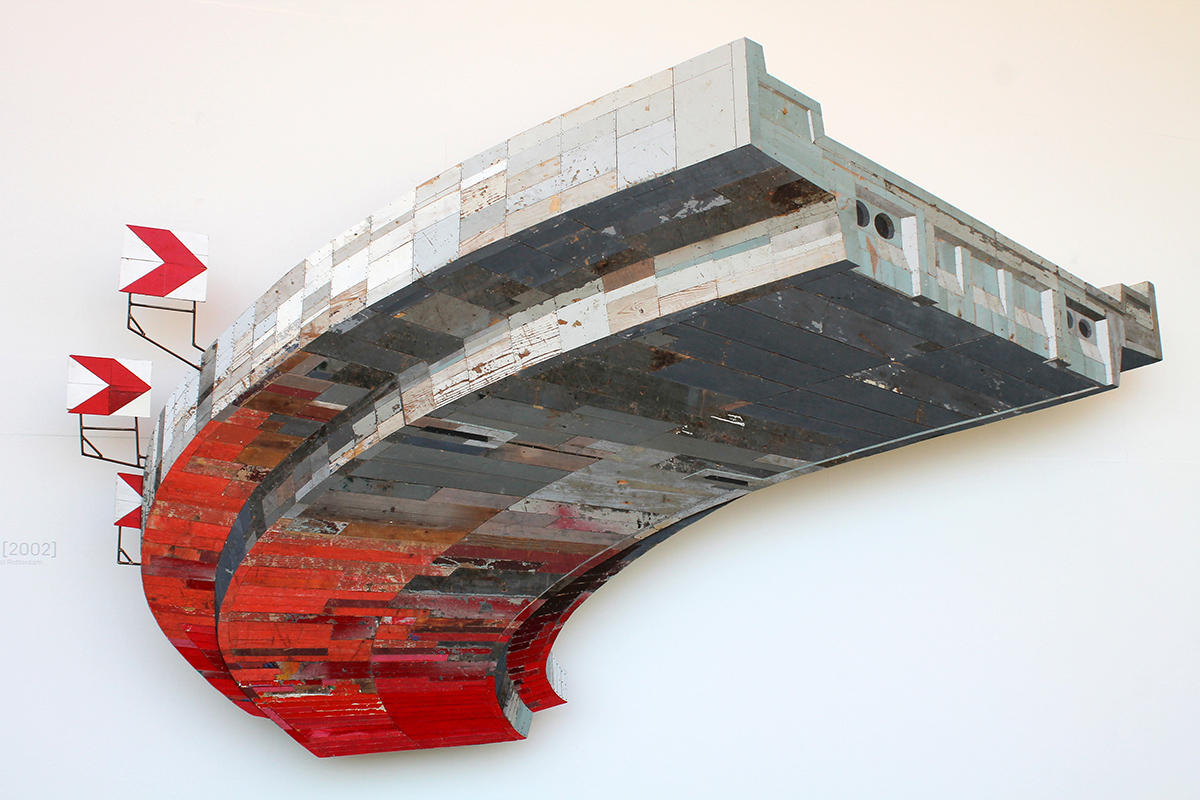
Fly Over (2002)

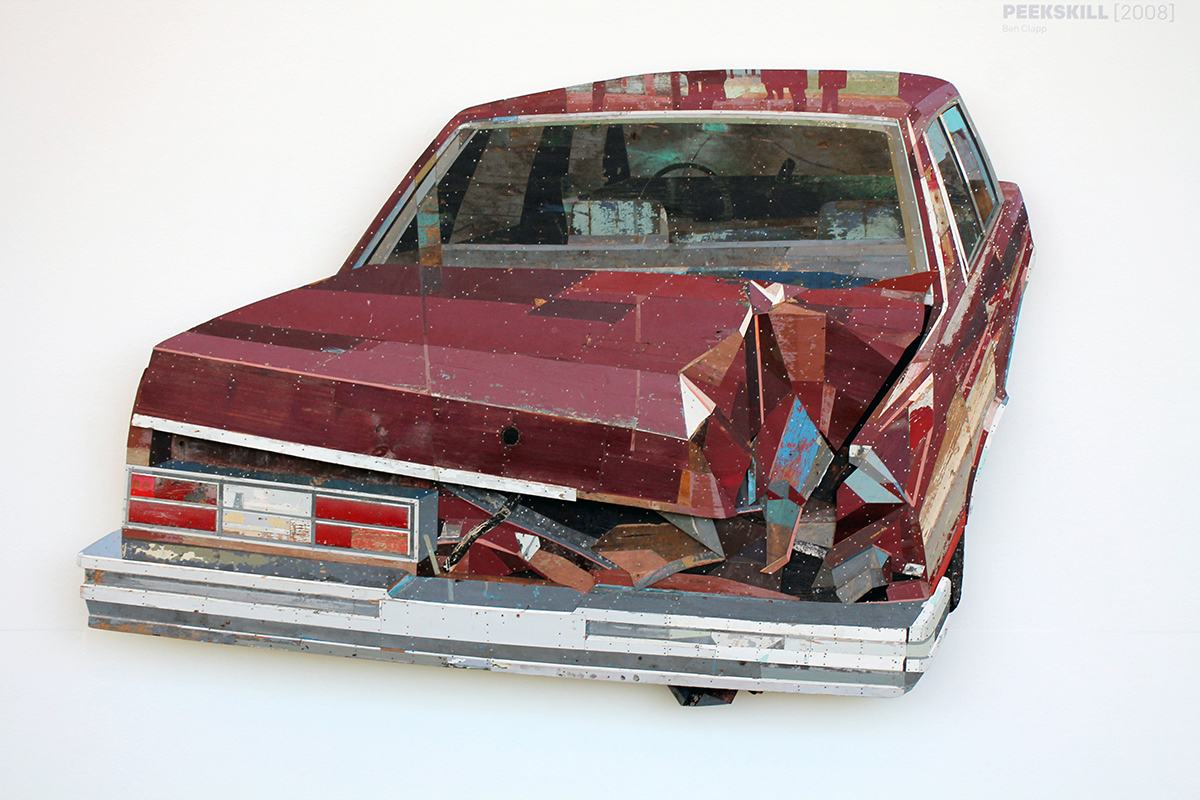
Peekskill (2008)

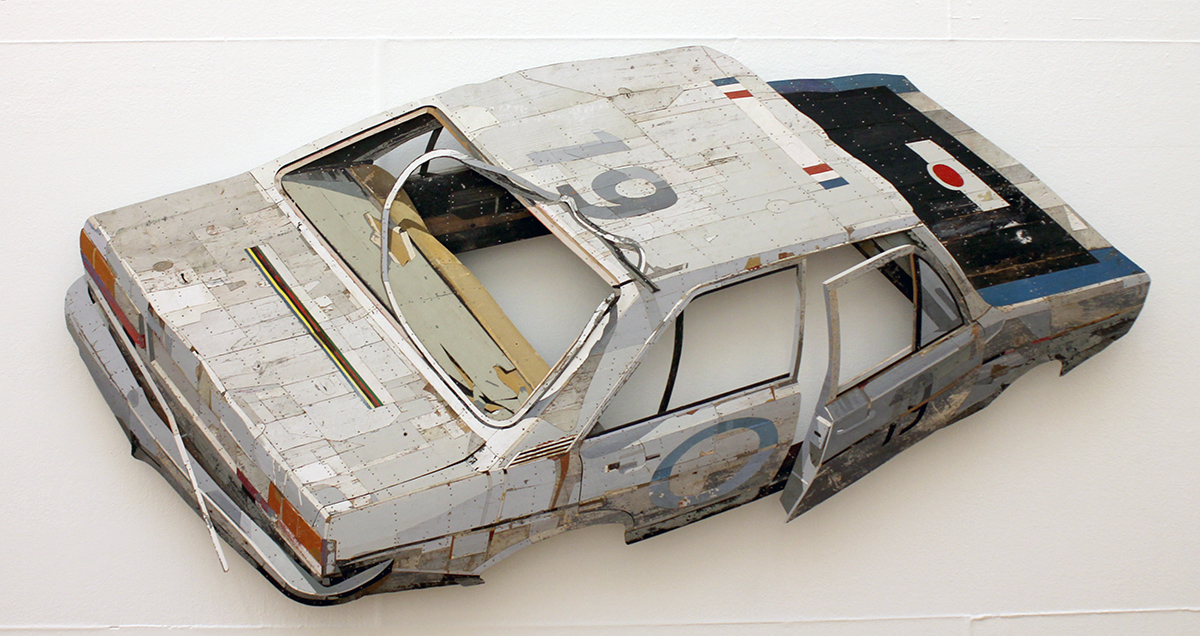
Voiture Balai (2010)

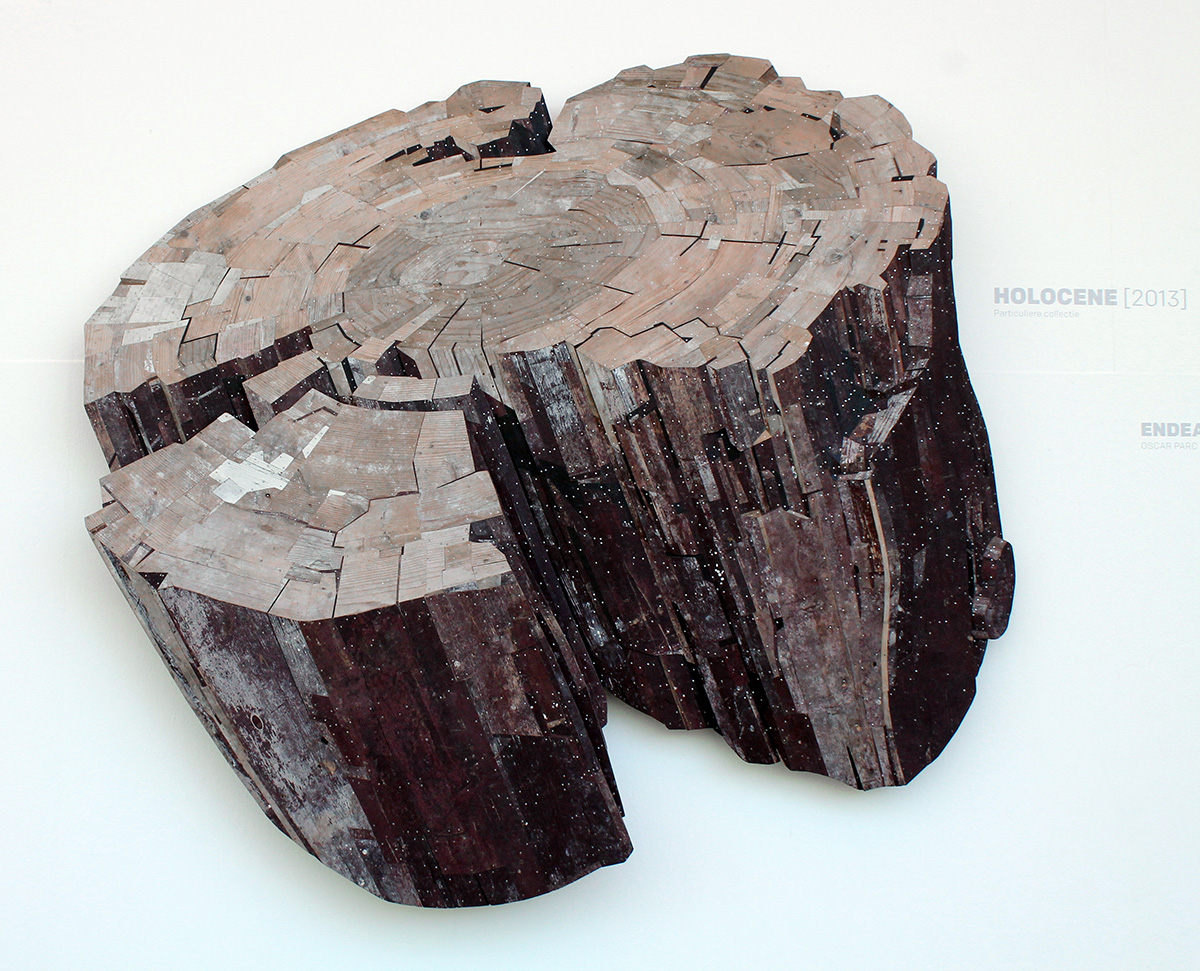
Holocene (2013)

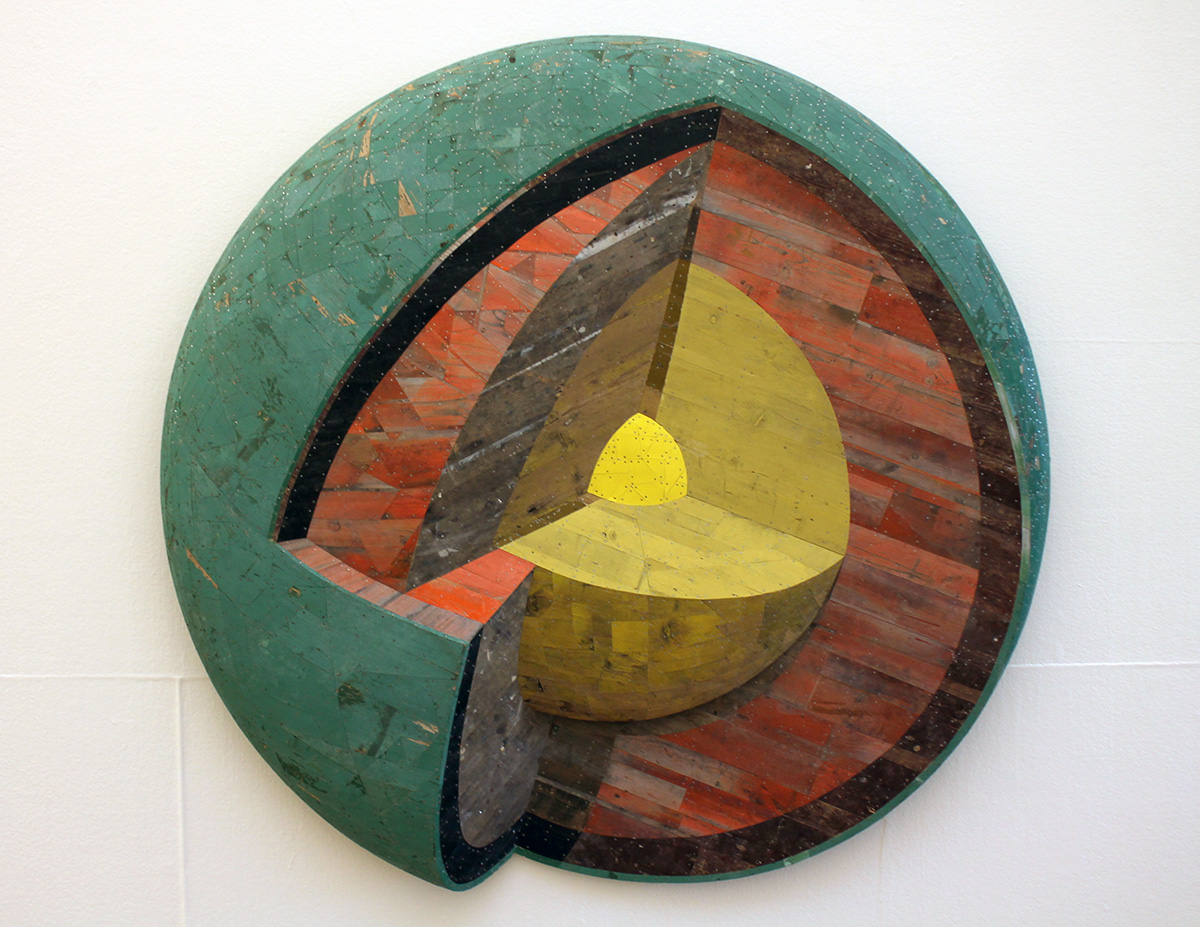
Bas-relief No. 100: Veneer Theory (2014),

== Exhibitions, a selection ==
Group exhibitions, a selection

- 1988. It's Boring but it's true!, Dyonisus, Rotterdam.
- 1989. Lineart, Ghent, Belgium; with Galerie Delta.
- 1990. Poliset, Gallery Givichi d’Arte Moderna, Ferrara, Italy.
- 1992. ..Autodesign in Nederland.., Kunsthal, Rotterdam.
- 1998. Industrieel Landschap. Gothaer Kunstforum Köln, Cologne, DE; project with Freek Drent.
- 2009. Kunst uit Huis V: Ron Klein Breteler, Stedelijk Museum Schiedam.
- 2011. Will Be Home, Ambach & Rice, Los Angeles CA, USA.

International solo exhibition, a selection

- 2008. Motor Memory, OkOk Gallery, Seattle WA, USA.
- 2010. A Shallow Wade Ambach & Rice, Seattle WA, USA
- 2011. Perishables, The Armory Show, New York NY, USA; with Ambach & Rice.
- 2013. Phasmid, Ambach & Rice, Los Angeles CA, USA.
- 2014. Dallas Art Fair, Dallas TX, USA; with Ambach & Rice.

== Selected publications ==
- Ron van der Ende, Galerie Delta, 1990.
- Frits van Dongen, Ron van der Ende, Braden King. The factory set, Frame Publishers, 2015.
