= Hans Kollhoff =

German architect and professor

Hans Kollhoff (born 18 September 1946 in Bad Lobenstein, Thuringia) is a German architect and professor.

He is a representative of Postmodern and New Classical Architecture, as well as a protagonist of New Urbanism.

== Early life ==
Kollhoff spent the first six years of his life on the family farm in Thuringia at the southern tip of the newly established DDR. In 1953 the family escaped to West Germany and settled in Northern Baden.

== Career ==
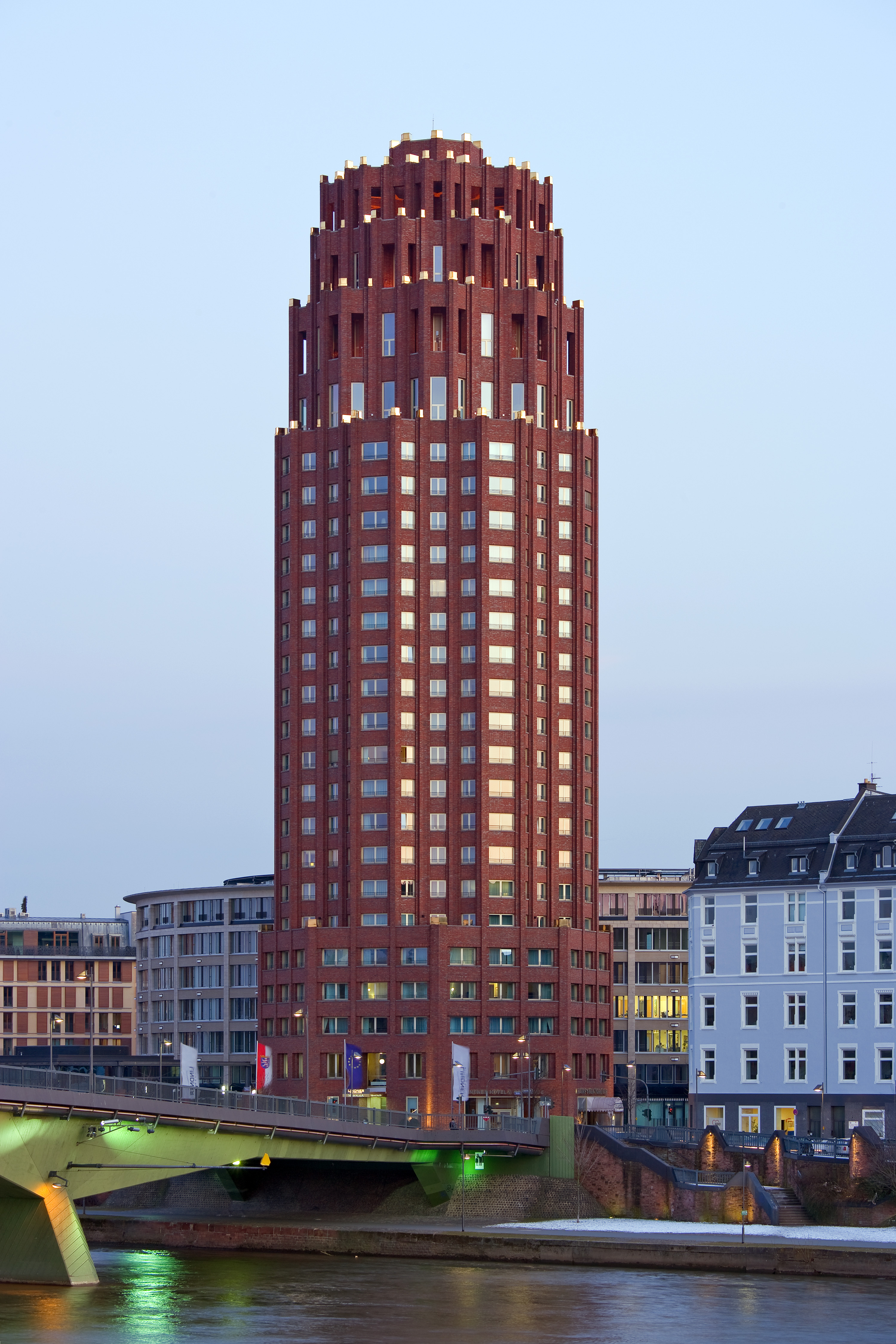
Main Plaza, Frankfurt am Main (completed in 2001)

Kollhoff began his architecture studies at the University of Karlsruhe in 1968. As an undergraduate student Kollhoff was indirectly introduced to the teaching of Egon Eiermann through the courses that Eiermann had written, but no longer taught, and through his work in the Karlsruhe studio of architect Gerhard Assem who had been a collaborator of Eiermann. In 1974 Kollhoff studied at the Vienna University of Technology, and worked for one year at the studio of Hans Hollein. He returned to Karlsruhe to complete his diploma thesis in 1975. Then with a scholarship from the DAAD to attend Cornell University, Kollhoff studied, alongside Rem Koolhaas, amongst the stimulating atmosphere prompted by the academic rivalry between architectural historian Colin Rowe and architect and theorist Oswald Mathias Ungers. Kollhoff became an assistant to Ungers in 1977.

Kollhoff opened his own studio in Berlin in 1978, and since 1984 has run the studio in partnership with Helga Timmermann.

Until 1985, he was an assistant at the HdK (Berlin University of the Arts), and until 2012, Kollhoff was Professor of Architecture and Construction at the ETH Zürich. He has held several guest-professorships both at home and abroad. His projects as an architect in Germany and Europe span all scales, from the civic to the residential.

Since 2004 Kollhoff leads the "Bauakademie" project, whose goal is to reconstruct the Karl Friedrich Schinkel building, Berlin 1836, which was demolished in 1962.

== Architecture ==
Hans Kollhoff's architecture is characterised by a classical building-style and the use of solid, traditional materials, such as stone and brick, worked according to traditional methods. During his career, Kollhoff has developed in the direction of a more and more traditional form, often using classical motifs. For this reason he is sometimes criticized for creating an outdated "retro-architecture", that loses itself in a nostalgic imitation of traditional formalism. However Kollhoff's work, with its attention to detail also within the interior space, may be read as a continuation of the work of early twentieth century architects, see Adolf Loos.

=== Germany ===
In Berlin, he has designed in Potsdamer Platz a high-rise tower in an old-New York brick style, for DaimlerChrysler. He was also responsible for the master planning of high-rise buildings on the Alexanderplatz. Among his works are also the reconstruction of the former Reichsbank into the new Foreign Office, and the so-called Leibnizkolonnaden in the district of Charlottenburg-Wilmersdorf near the Kurfürstendamm. In 2005 he constructed the inner rooms of the exclusive night club Goya on Nollendorfplatz, that opened on December 1 in the building where the Metropol had formerly been. In Frankfurt am Main he has erected the 88-meter-tall (289 ft) residential building Main Plaza in the Deutschherrnviertel. At Alte Messe Leipzig, he designed in 1996 one of the nine head offices of the German Central Bank. which was in 1999 awarded the Architekturpreis der Stadt Leipzig (Architecture Award of the City of Leipzig).

=== Netherlands ===
Outside of Germany, Kollhoff has designed numerous buildings in the Netherlands. His first project, the Piraeus, was realized in 1994 on the KNSM Island in Amsterdam. His most known projects in the country however were built in Rotterdam: both the Statendam high-rise tower at the Binnenrotte and the Compagnie residential buildings at the Kop van Zuid stand out in their respective area's. Other notable projects of Kollhoff in the Netherlands include De Colonel in Maastricht, the Foortse Towers Vathorst in Amersfoort and the building of the Dutch Ministry of Justice and Security and Ministry of the Interior and Kingdom Relations (also known as the JuBi-building) at the Turfmarkt in The Hague – his highest project yet.

== Gallery ==
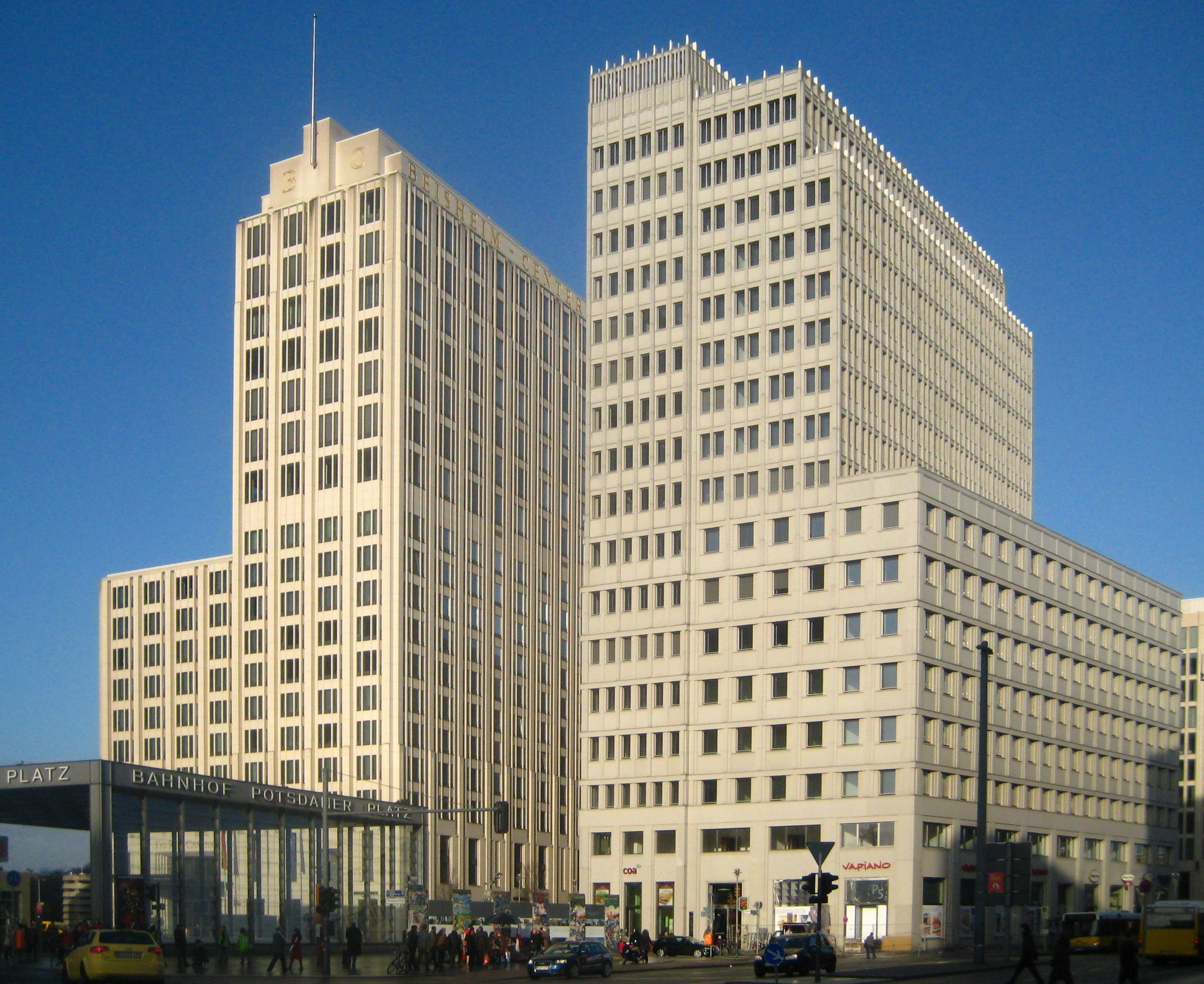
The Beisheim Center on the Potsdamer Platz, Berlin

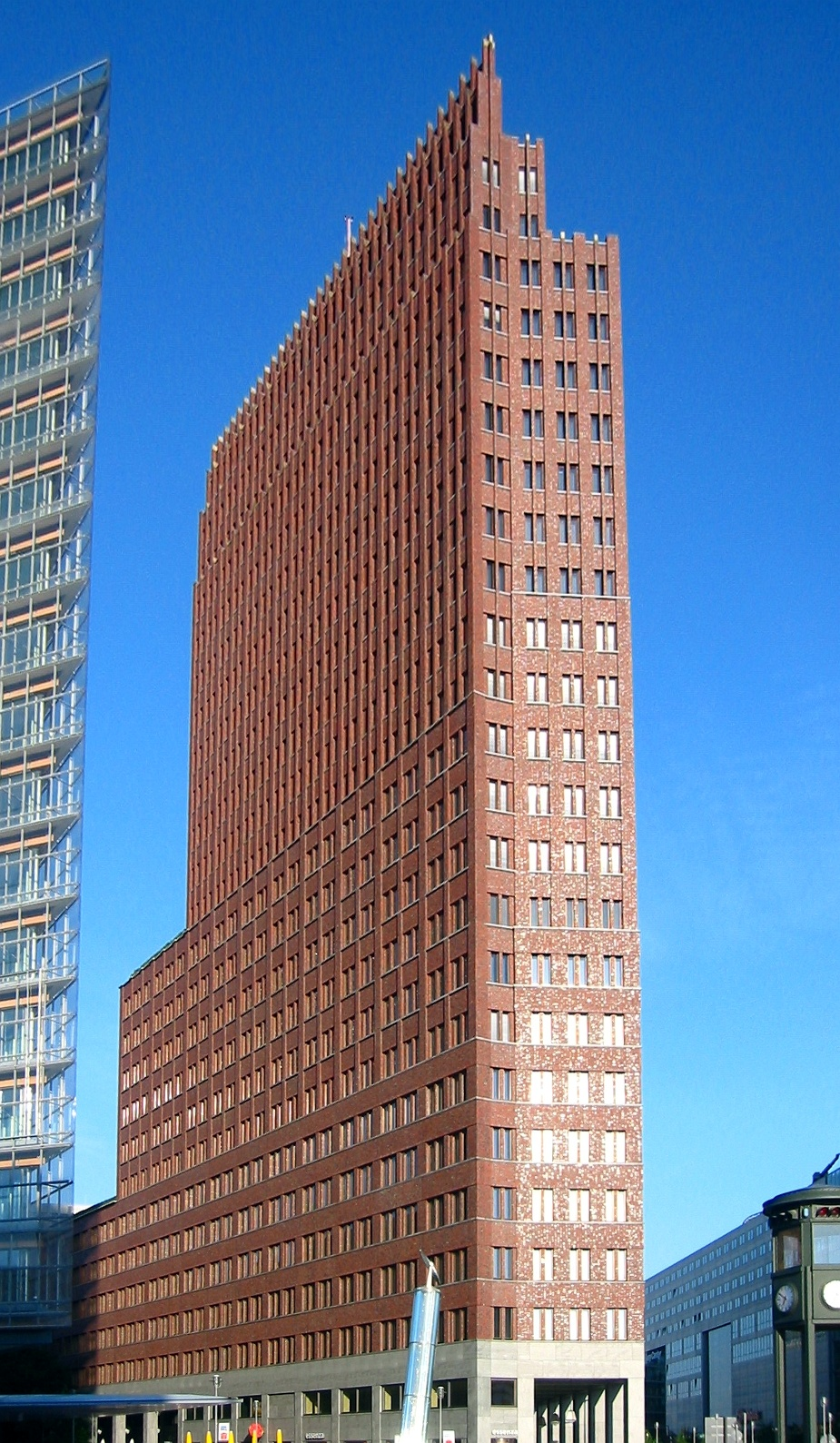
Kollhoff-Tower at the Potsdamer Platz, Berlin

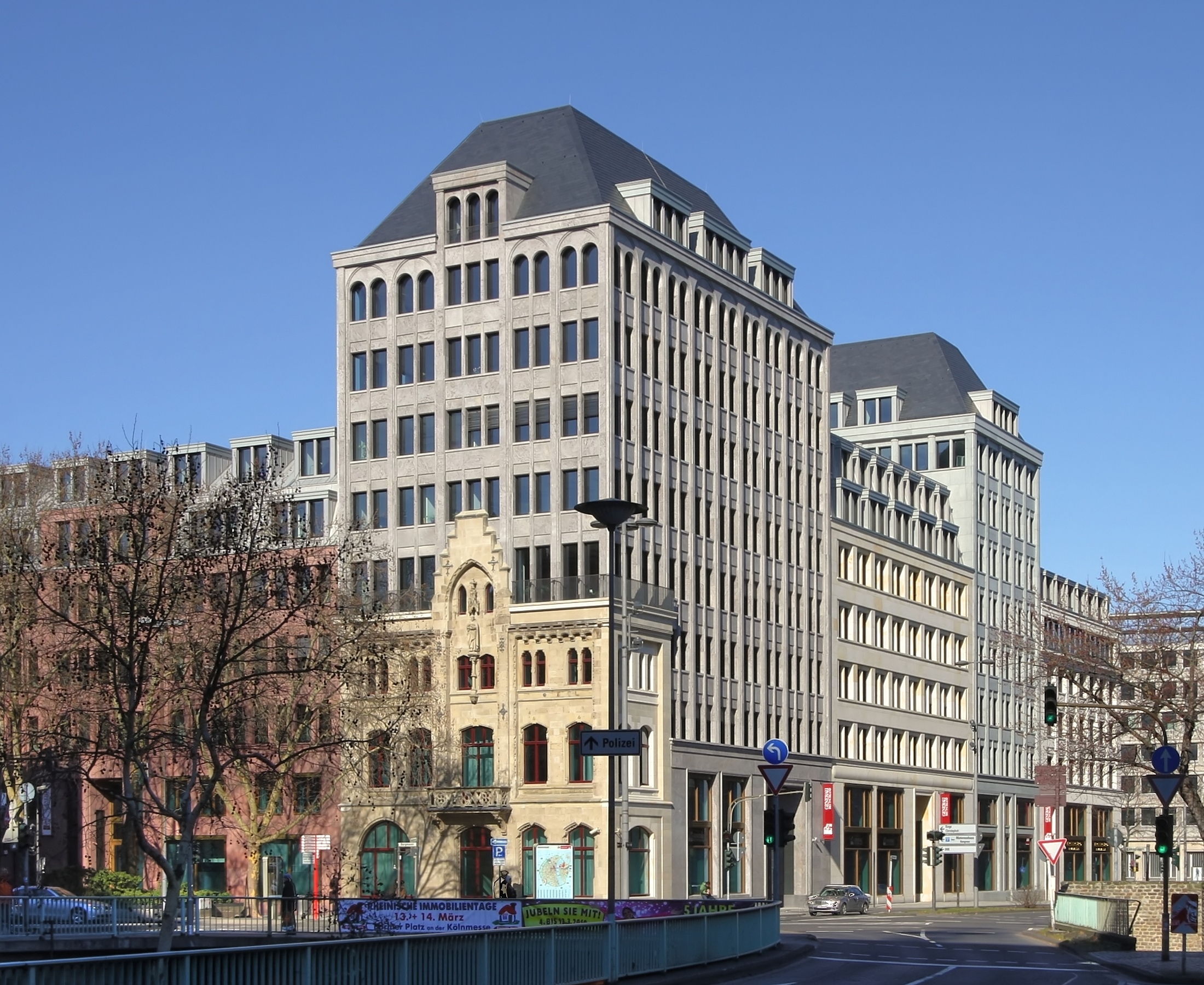
Dominium in Cologne

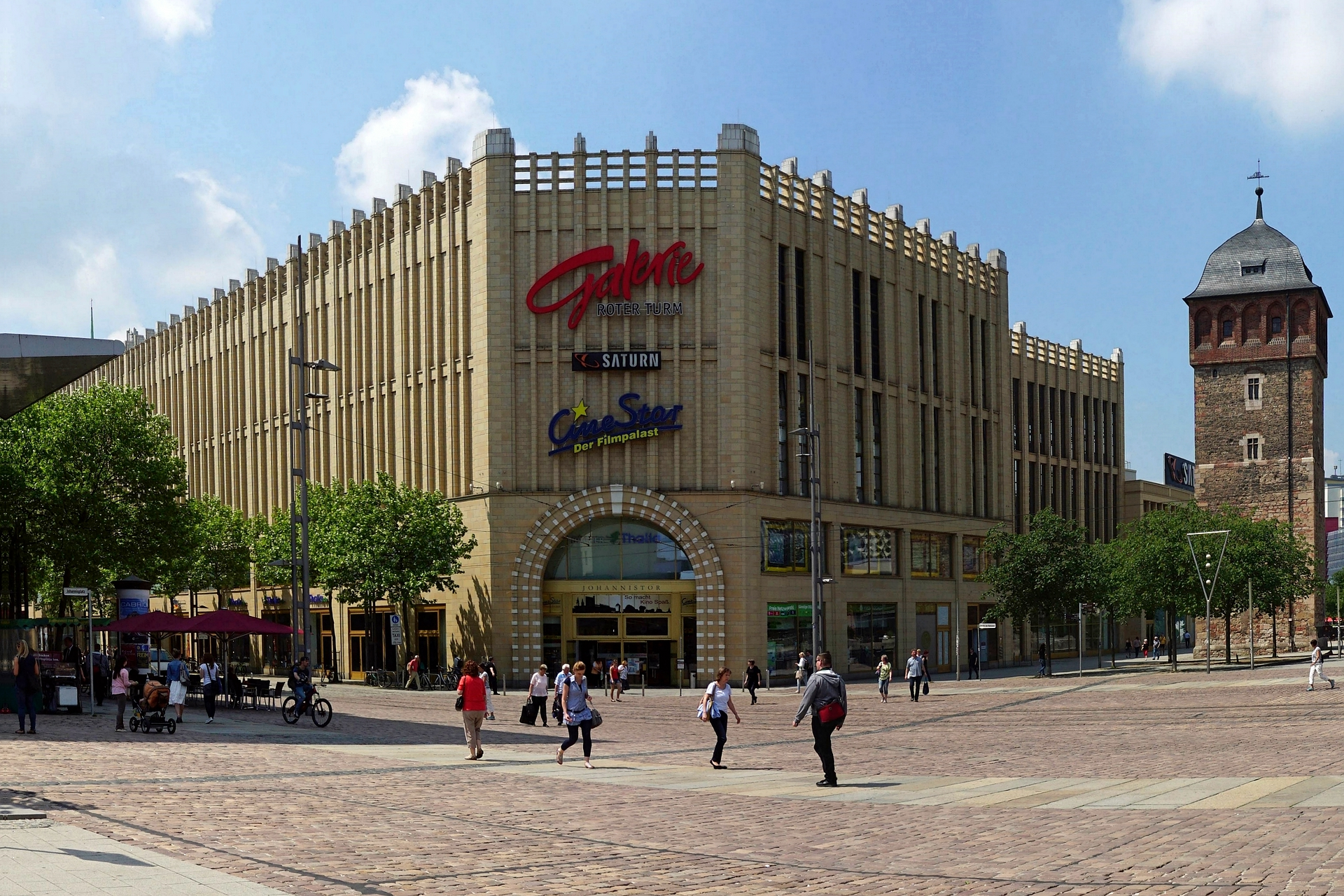
Galerie Roter Turm at the Neumarkt, Chemnitz

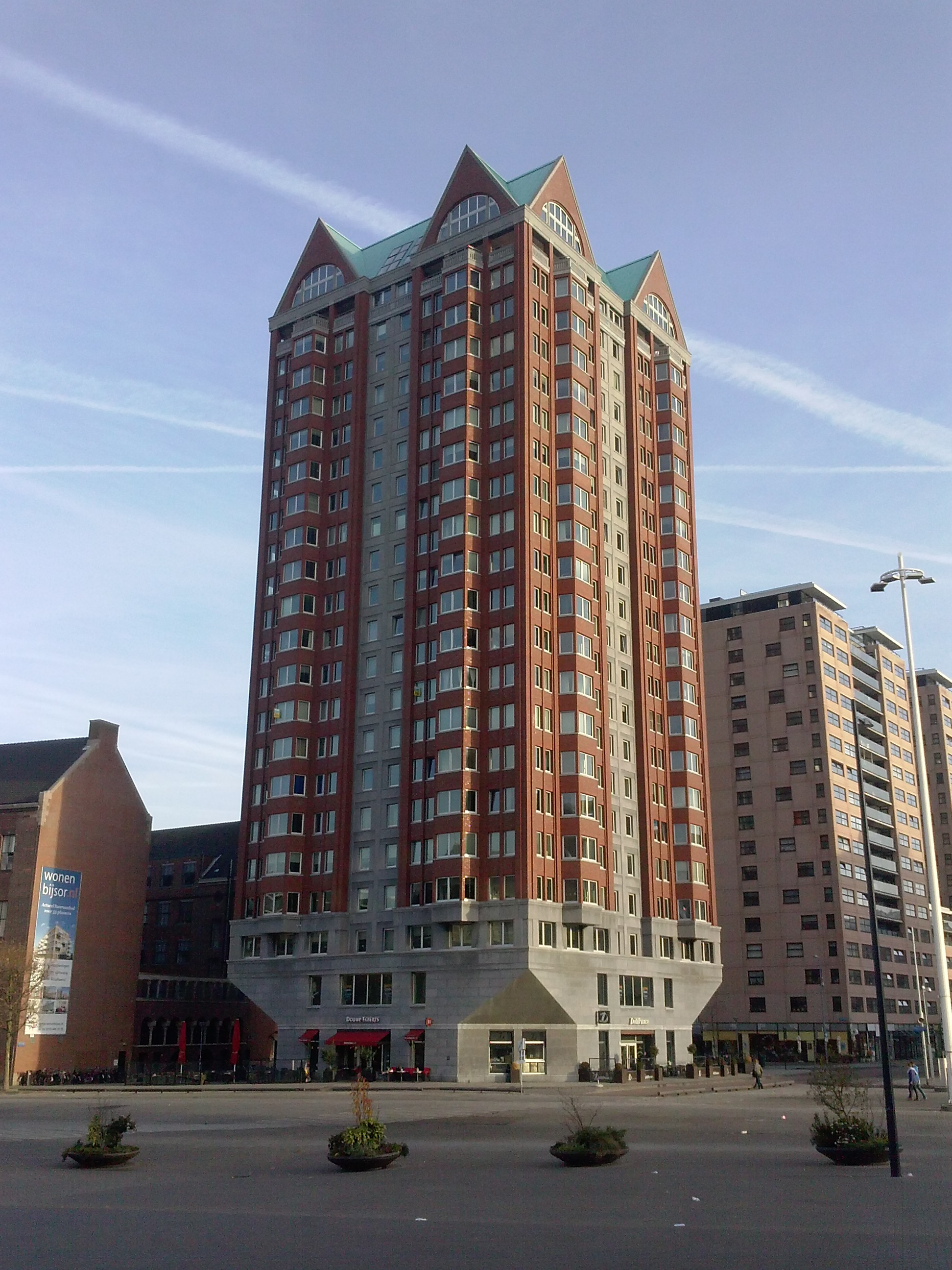
The Statendam in Rotterdam

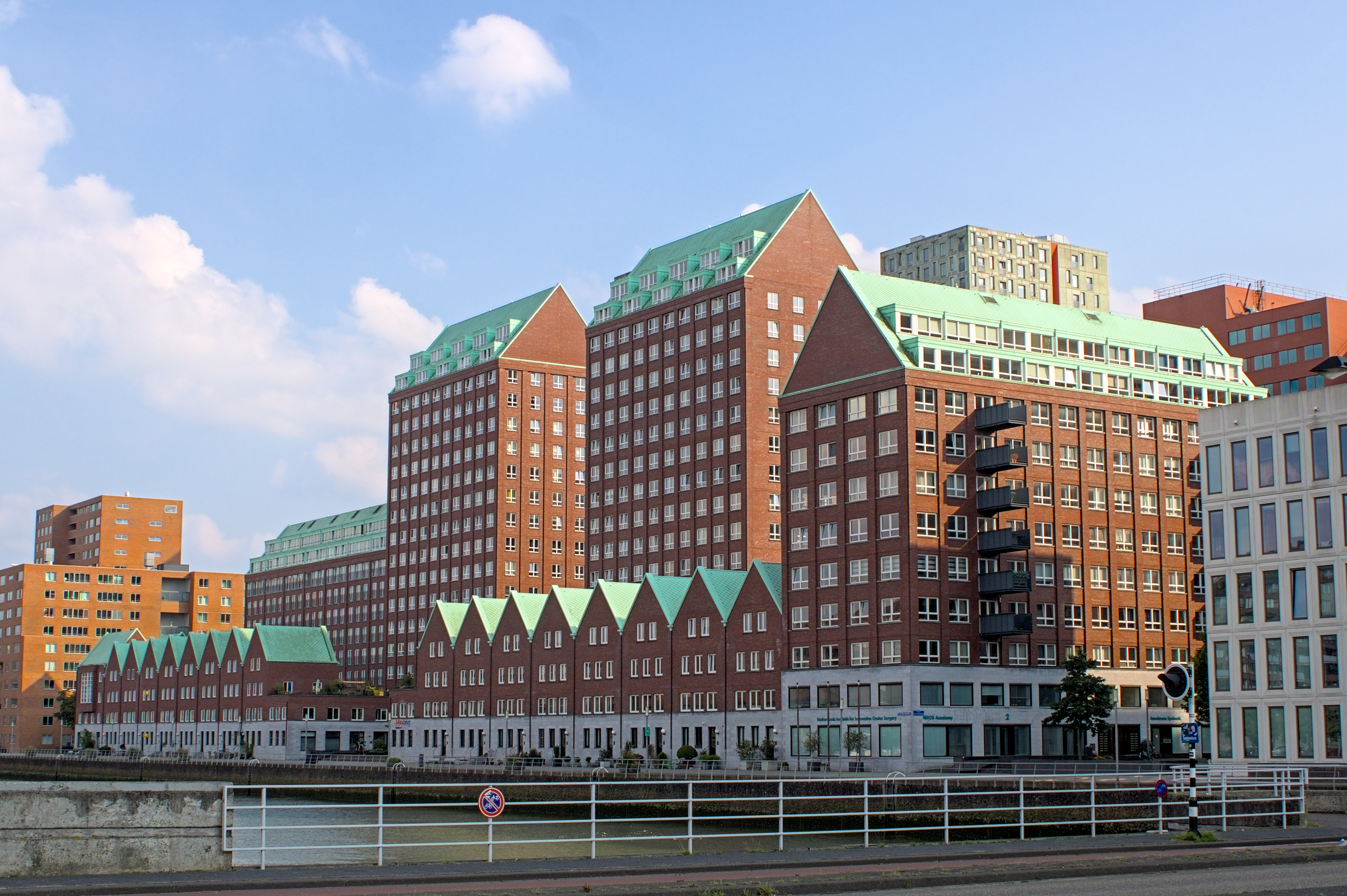
The Compagnie in Rotterdam

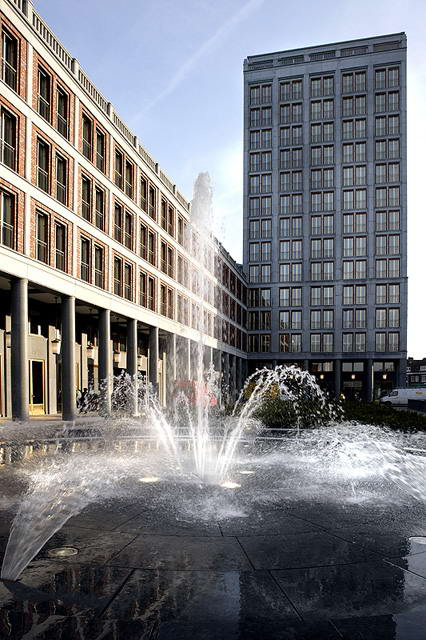
Colonel Building in Maastricht

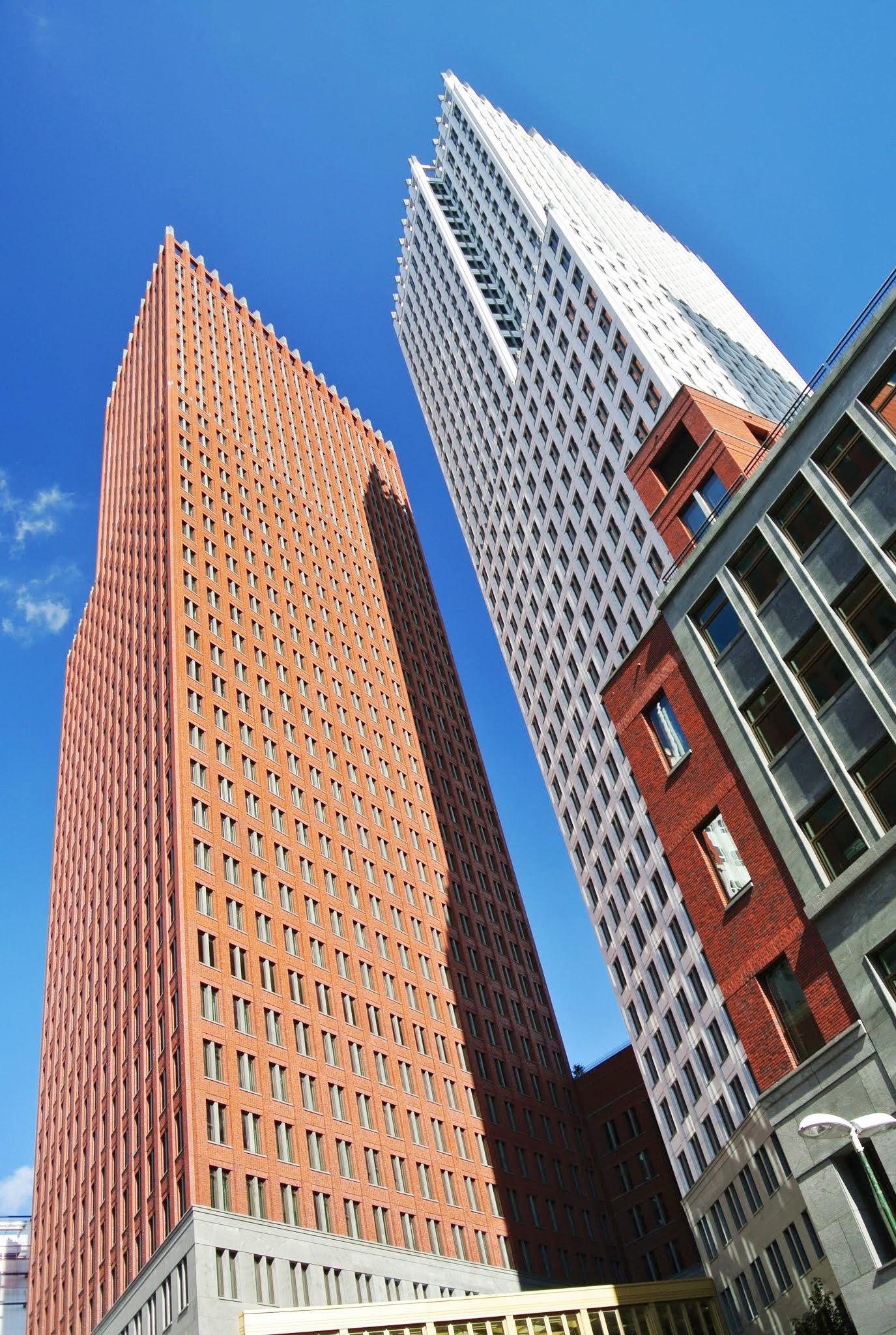
The JuBi-building in The Hague

== Literature ==
- Kollhoff, Hans, Wohnen, Studentenprojekte (1999) ISBN 3-7212-0464-6
- Kollhoff, Hans, Hans Kollhoff: Architektur/Architecture (2003) ISBN 3-7913-2656-2
- Cepl, Jasper, Kollhoff & Timmermann Architects: Hans Kollhoff (2004) ISBN 1-904313-27-2
