= Atelier Kempe Thill =

Architectural firm

Atelier Kempe Thill is an international architectural firm based in Rotterdam, the Netherlands, founded in 2000 by German architects André Kempe and Oliver Thill. Both Kempe and Thill were born in East Germany and graduated in architecture from the Technical University of Dresden (TU Dresden). The practice is known for its minimalist design approach, careful material detailing, and explorations of affordable high-quality architecture within constrained budgets.

Oliver Thill died on 2 March 2026, at the age of 55.

== Early work and recognition ==
Atelier Kempe Thill gained international attention with projects such as:

- The Dutch Pavilion for the International Garden Exhibition IGA 2003 in Rostock, Germany, known as the Hedge Building, which combined architecture and landscape in a minimal form.
- Youth Hostel in Prora (Germany, 2004), reusing part of the monumental Nazi-era Prora complex for new civic functions.
- Liszt Concert Hall in Raiding (Austria, 2005), designed as a "modest yet high-performing" venue emphasizing acoustic excellence.

== Major projects ==
Atelier Kempe Thill's portfolio spans a wide range of typologies, including residential, cultural, and public space projects. Selected works include:

- 23 Townhouses in Amsterdam-Osdorp, offering highly affordable yet well-detailed housing units.
- HipHouse in Zwolle, a pioneering mixed-use building combining living and working spaces.
- City House in Antwerp, a compact urban home blending bungalow-like spatial qualities with a city context.
- Junky Hotel in Amsterdam, a transformation project converting a building for vulnerable social groups into a flexible, supportive environment.
- Îlot Beaumont in Euralille, France, developed in collaboration with Atelier 56S, emphasizing urban uniformity and metropolitan density.
- De Hood social housing project in the Netherlands, blending transparency and affordability.

== Awards and recognition ==
- Maaskant Prize for Young Architects (2005): awarded to Oliver Thill.
- Special Mention, European Prize for Urban Public Space (2010): for the Open Air Theatre at Grotekerkplein in Rotterdam.
