= Roter Turm, Chemnitz =

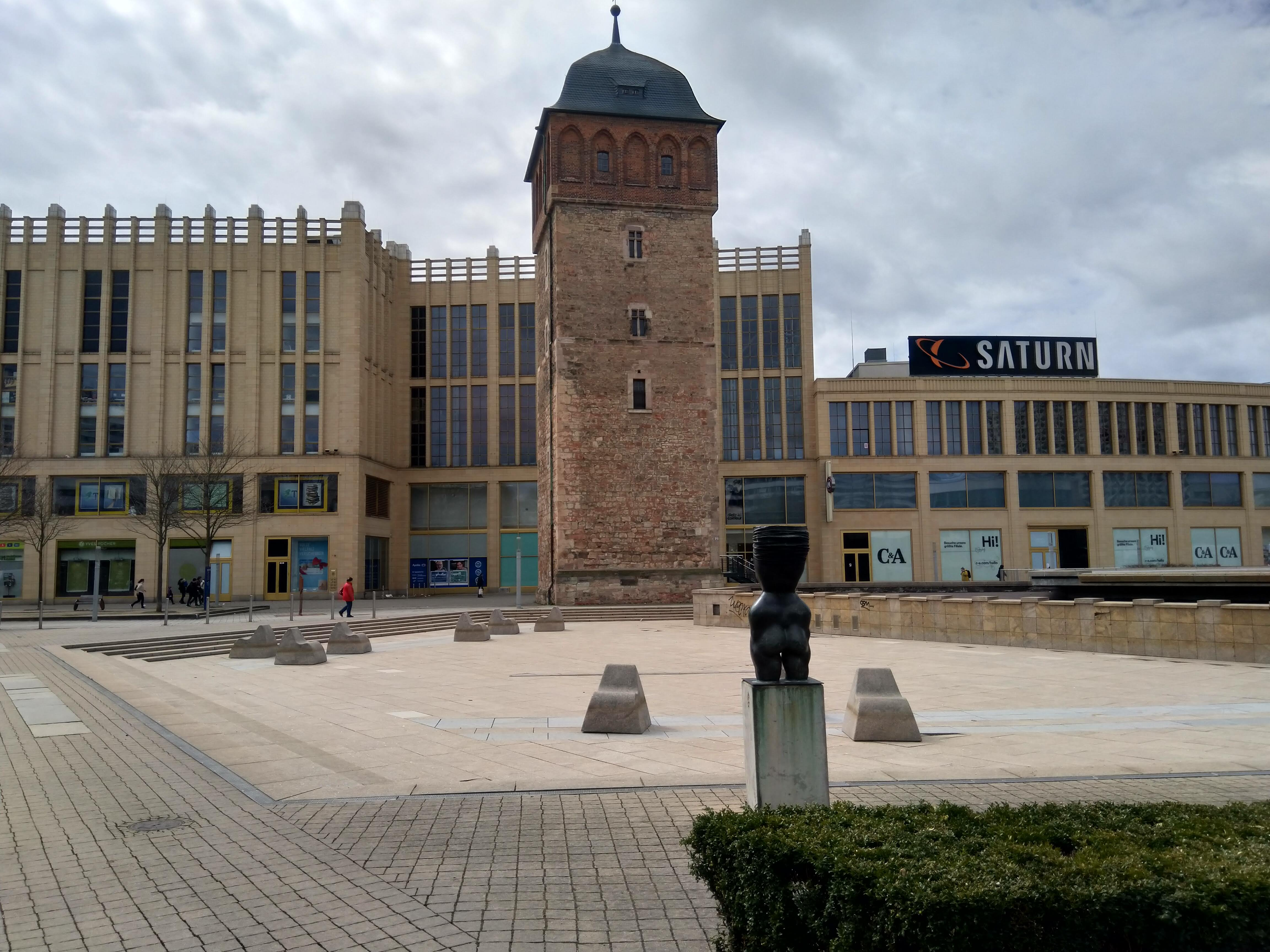
- Roter Turm (Red Tower) in 2022
- Interactive map of the Roter Turm, Chemnitz area

General information
- Type: Bergfried
- Location: Strasse der Nationen 3, 09111 Chemnitz, Germany
- Coordinates: 50.83418°N 12.92148°E
- Completed: around 1170
- Renovated: 1957-1959 and after 1990

Height
- Height: 35 m (115 ft)

Website
- Roter Turm zu Chemnitz (in German)

Roter Turm (litt.: Red Tower) is a building in Chemnitz in Saxony, Germany. It is 35 m (115 ft) tall and the oldest surviving building in the city.

== Name ==
The lower part of the tower is built of quarry stones of the main regional building stone. Its name is attributed to the predominant red color of the building material of Chemnitz porphyry tuff. This rock, a type of tuff close to ignimbrite, has been used in the city and its region for centuries.

== History ==
Roter Turm is the most conspicuous surviving building from the Middle Ages in Chemnitz. Its lower part probably dates back to the late 12th century or the beginning of the 13th century.

The tower initially served as a keep to protect the surrounding settlements, later it was the seat of the advocatus (in German: Voigt). During systematic investigations in 1957/1958, it was found that the city wall is younger than the tower and connects to it. In 1555, the upper floor was built of brick with Gothic facing architecture, which was covered with red roof tiles. The tower itself was plastered until the middle of the 19th century and probably painted white.

Until about 1900, the tower and its annex were used as a prison. This function saved the Roter Turm from demolition in the early 19th century, when Chemnitz's city fortifications were demolished. Inmates of the Roter Turm during its time as a prison included August Bebel and Karl Stülpner. With the redevelopment of Theaterstrasse at the end of the 19th century, the previously free-standing Roter Turm disappeared behind a row of houses, so that only the tower hood could be seen of it.

During one of the air raids on Chemnitz at the end of the Second World War, the tower burned out. It was rebuilt between 1957 and 1959.

== Trivia ==
The shape of the classic 500 millilitres (500 ml; 18 imp fl oz) bottle of dishwashing liquid brand „fit“ was modelled on the Roter Turm in 1968. The washing-up liquid was produced until 1967 at the enterprise named VEB Fettchemie Karl-Marx-Stadt. In the run-up to the opening of Chemnitz's European Capital of Culture year 2025, the Roter Turm was illuminated accordingly in December 2024 for the 70th anniversary of the dishwashing liquid „fit“.

The neighboring shopping center „Galerie Roter Turm“, which opened on 27 April 2000, is named after the Roter Turm.

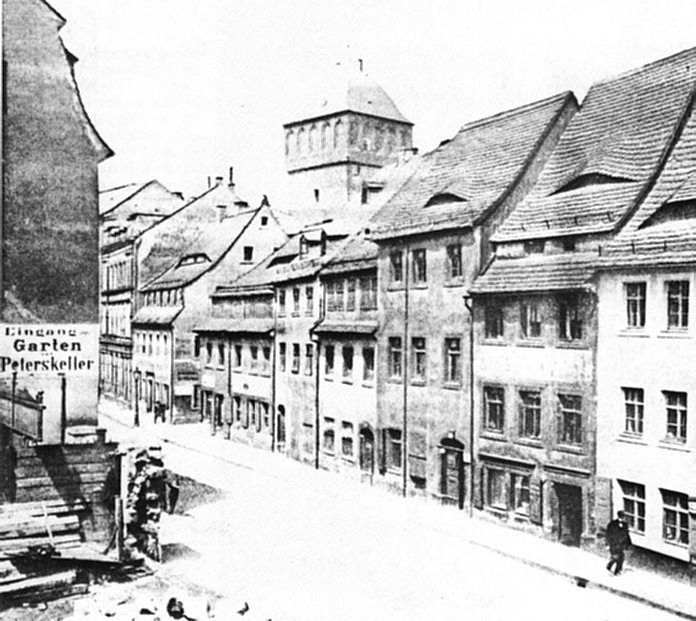
Roter Turm and Herrengasse, around 1890

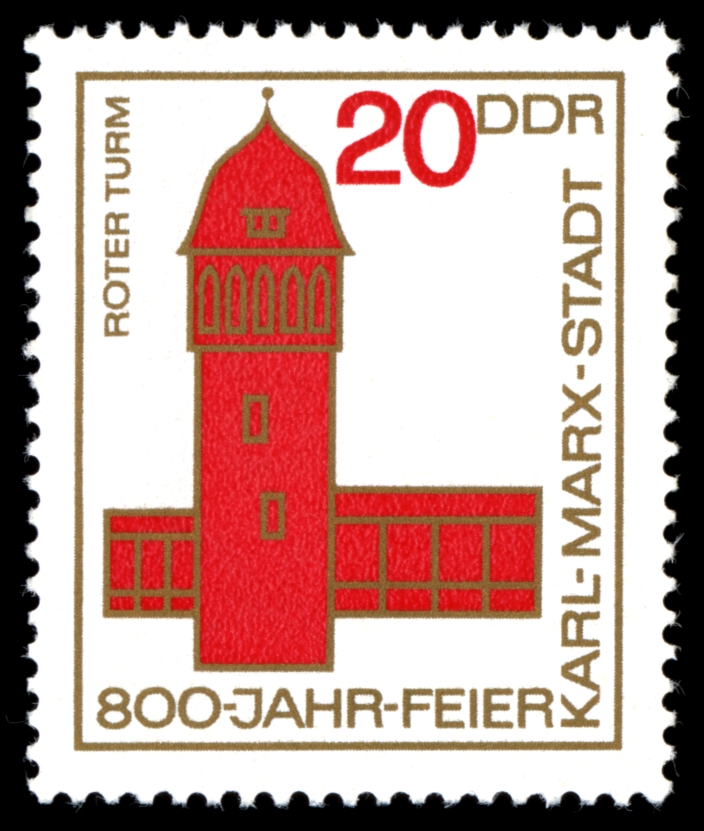
GDR stamp from 1965, designed by Manfred Gottschall

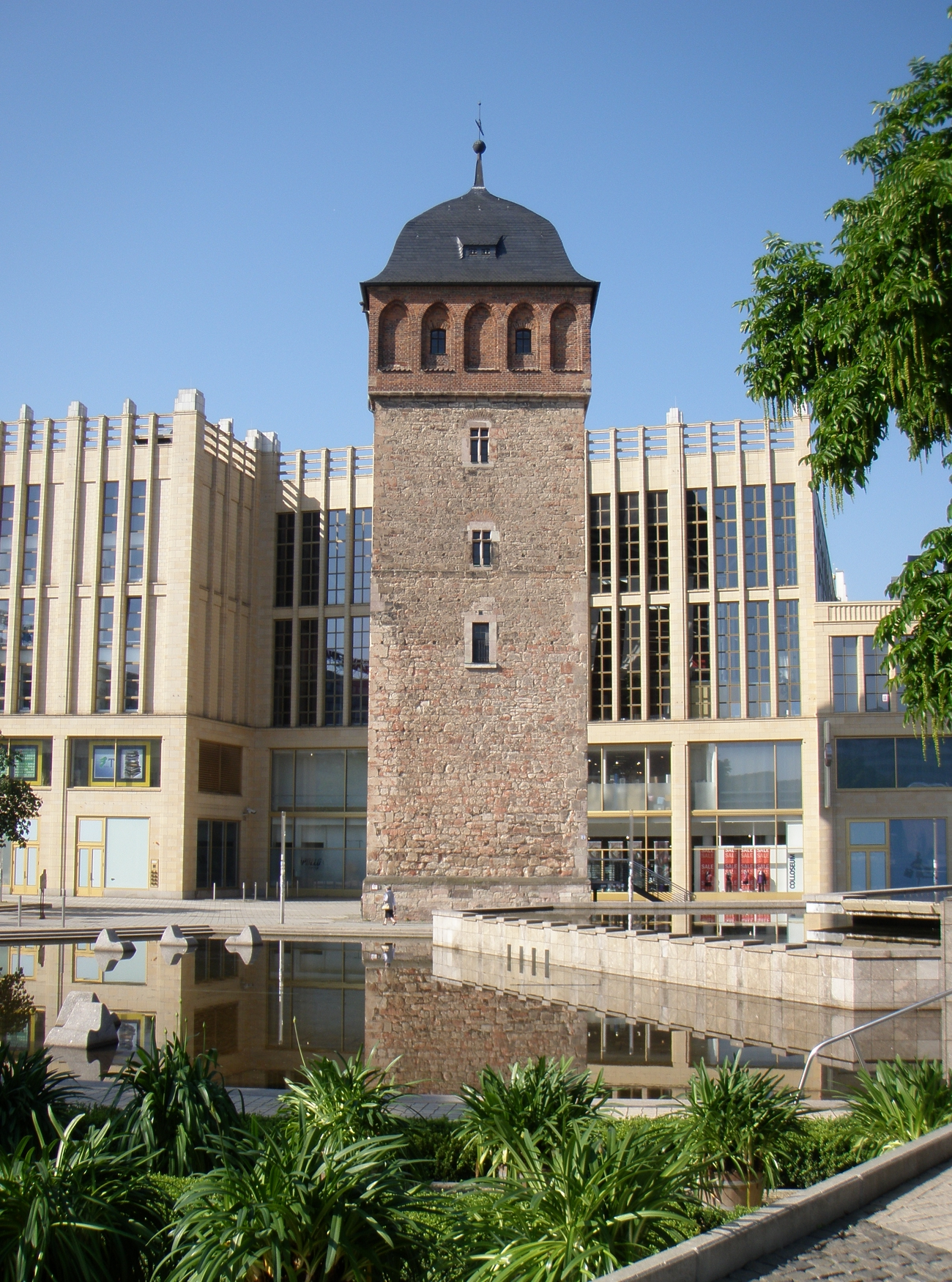
Roter Turm in front of the shopping center „Galerie Roter Turm“ in 2009

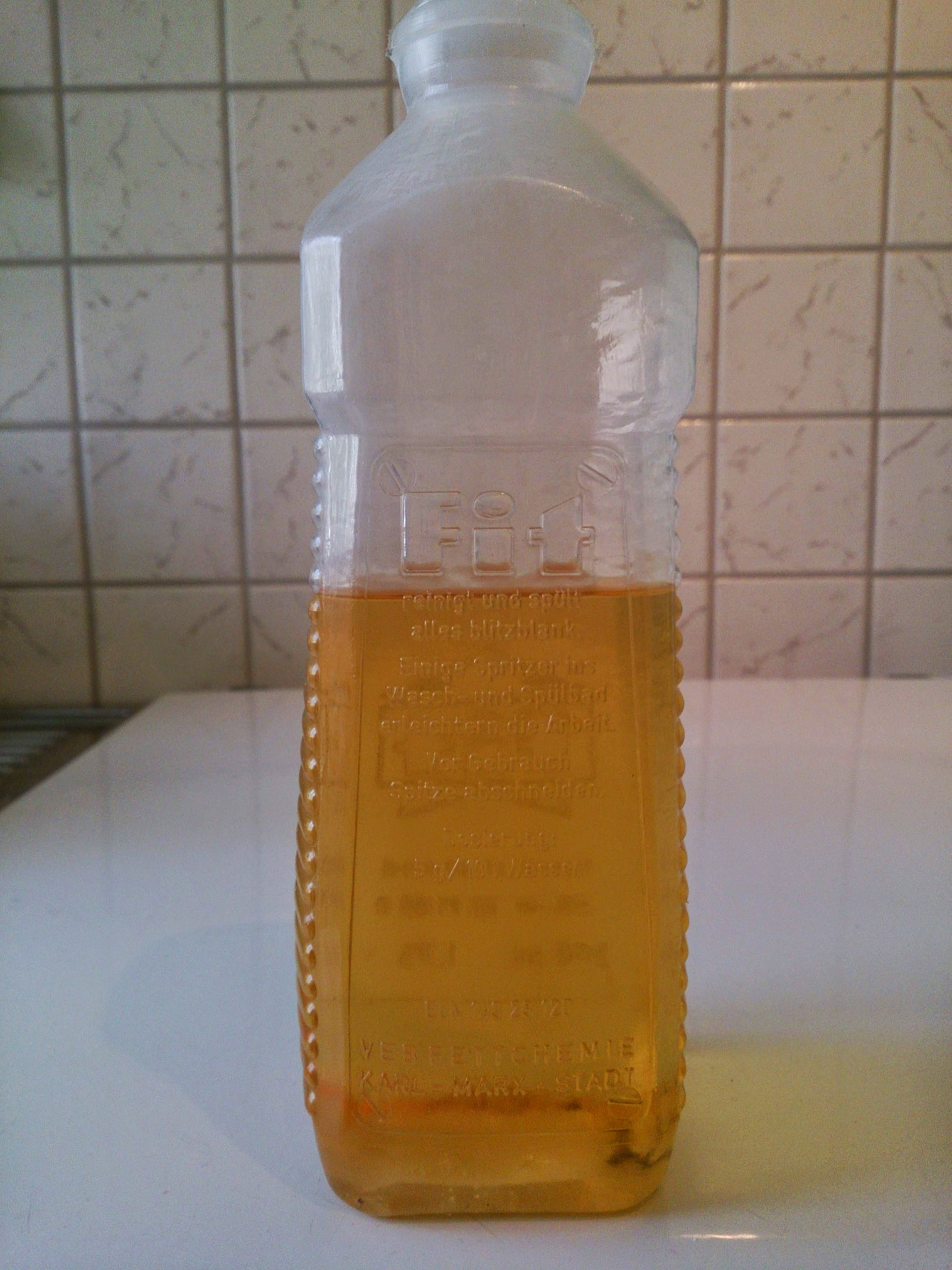
Classic bottle of dishwashing liquid „fit“

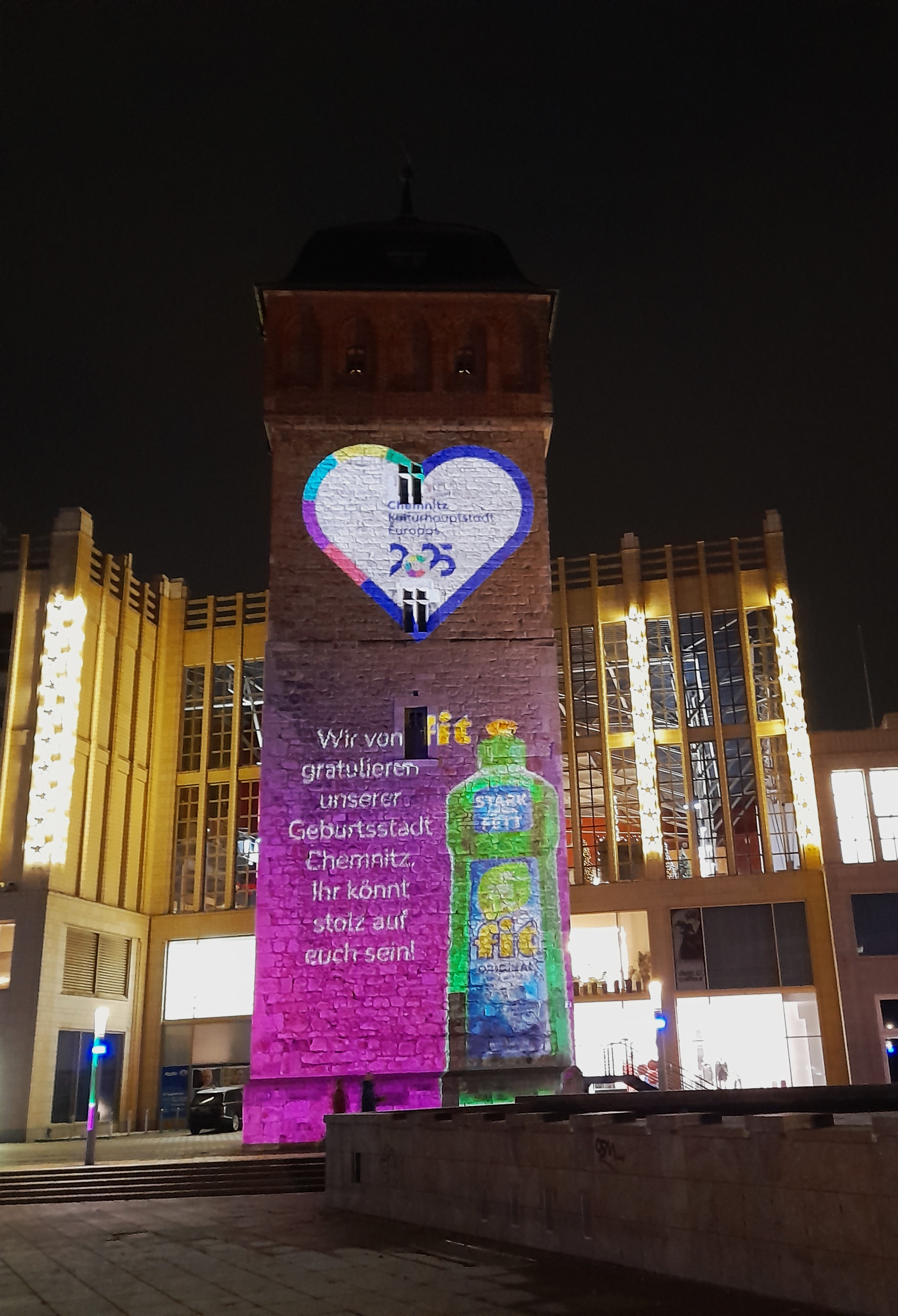
70 Years „Fit“ – Light Art at Roter Turm (2024)
