= Pander =

Pander may refer to:

== People ==
- Arne Pander (1931–2015), Danish international speedway rider
- Christian Pander (born 1983), a German footballer
- Heinz Christian Pander (1794-1865), Russian biologist and embryologist
- Pier Pander (1864–1919), Dutch sculptor and medal designer
- Pander Brothers, filmmakers and comic book artists Jacob (born 1965) and Arnold Pander (born 1967)

== Other uses ==
- Pander (prostitution), the facilitation or provision of a prostitute in the arrangement of a sex act with a customer
- Pander & Son, a Dutch aircraft company
- Pander Society, an informal organisation for the promotion of the study of conodont palaeontology

== See also ==
- Pandering (disambiguation)
