= Prix de Rome (Netherlands) =

Dutch art award for young artists and architects

The Dutch Prix de Rome is based on the originally French Prix de Rome and is awarded annually to architects and artists younger than 35. The award was initiated in 1807 by Louis Bonaparte, then ruler of the Kingdom of Holland, and confirmed after independence by William I of the Netherlands. It was canceled in 1851 by the statesman Johan Rudolph Thorbecke and reinstated in 1870 by William III of the Netherlands. From 1870 to 2011 the winners were selected by the Rijksakademie in Amsterdam. Since then, the Mondriaan Fund organises and finances the Prix de Rome.

In 2025 the prize is €60,000.

== Prizewinners ==
Source: Prix de Rome

=== Architecture ===
- 1808 Jan de Greef, Zeger Reyers and Anthonie Sminck Pitloo (first awards)
- 1809 Johan David Zocher jnr
- 1827 Johannes Craner for the design of a Dutch Royal Institute of Science and Fine Arts building (first Grand Prize)
- 1837 Anthony Willem van Dam
- 1900 J.F. Büchel
- 1906 Johan Melchiot van der Mey
- 1909 Dirk Frederik Slothouwer
- 1918 Hermanus Petrus Josephus de Vries
- 1921 Cornelis van Eesteren
- 1924 Johannes Petrus Leonardus Hendriks
- 1935 Arthur Staal
- 1946 Jaap Schipper
- 1954 Joost van der Grinten for the design of an academy for visual arts
- 1962 Piet Blom for the design of the 'Pestalozzi' children's village
- 1966 Carel Weeber
- 1986 Wim van den Bergh for the design of Pandorama, a science museum for Amsterdam; Rik van Dolderen won the Prix de Rome Design & Landscape Architecture prize for a design for the Noordrand of Rotterdam
- 1990 Bert Dirrix (1954) for the design for a building complex on the Spui in The Hague; Adriaan Geuze won the Prix de Rome Urban Design & Landscape Architecture prize
- 1995 Rob Hootsmans for Waterstad (Water City), a sea water aquarium; Branimir Medic won the Prix de Rome Urban Design & Landscape Architecture prize for the design for 50.000 residencies in Amsterdam
- 2001 Gianni Cito for Superbowl; John Lonsdale won the Prix de Rome Urban Design & Landscape Architecture for the design Shifting Horizons, a development strategy for the Westland.
- 2006 Ronald Rietveld for the design Generating Dune Scapes for the harbour of IJmuiden.
- 2010 Olv Klijn for Schijven, weefsels en publiek domein for the August Allebéplein in Amsterdam
- 2014 Donna van Milligen Bielke for Cabinet of Curiosities for the Hoogstraat in Rotterdam
- 2018 Alessandra Covini for Amsterdam Allegories
- 2022 Lesia Topolnyk for No Innocent Landscape

=== Visual Arts ===
- 1807 Pieter Rudolph Kleijn and Abraham Teerlink (landscape); Christian Didrik Forssell (graphic art); Jean-Eugène-Charles Alberti, Woutherus Mol and Philip van der Wal (history) (first awards)
- 1808 Josephus Augustus Knip (landscape); Jozef Karel de Meulemeester (graphic art); Tjarko Cramer (history)
- 1809 Paulus Joseph Gabriël (sculpture)
- 1819 Ferdinand de Braekeleer (history)
- 1821 Jean Baptiste Lodewijk Maes (history)
- 1823 Louis Royer (sculpture)
- 1825 Jean Baptiste de Fiennes (history)
- 1831 Hendrik Willem Cramer (painting)
- 1836 Hendrik Willem Couwenberg (graphic art)
- 1839 Johan Hendrik Koelman (painting)
- 1849 Jan Francois Brouwenaar (sculpture)
- 1884 Jan Dunselman and Jacobus van Looy (jointly for painting)
- 1885 Pier Pander (sculpture)
- 1887 Paul Rink (painting)
- 1888 Eduard Jacobs for Jonge maaier uit Juda (Young mower from Judah) (sculpture)
- 1896 Johannes Hendrik Philip Wortman (sculpture)
- 1899 Julie A.C. Mijnssen (sculpture)
- 1901 A. Herman Gouwe (painting)
- 1902 Frederik Engel Jeltsema (sculpture)
- 1904 Jan Sluijters (painting)
- 1905 C.A. Smout (sculpture)
- 1907 Tjeerd Bottema (painting)
- 1908 B.M.A. Ingen Housz (sculpture)
- 1910 Frans Hogerwaard (painting)
- 1911 Theo van Reijn (sculpture)
- 1913 D. Bueno de Mesquita (painting); Engelien Reitsma-Valença (graphic art)
- 1917 Charles Vos (sculpture)
- 1920 Corrie Demmink (sculpture)
- 1922 Charles Eyck (painting)
- 1923 Frits J. van Hall (sculpture)
- 1925 Antonius Lüske (painting)
- 1926 Jobs G. Wertheim (sculpture)

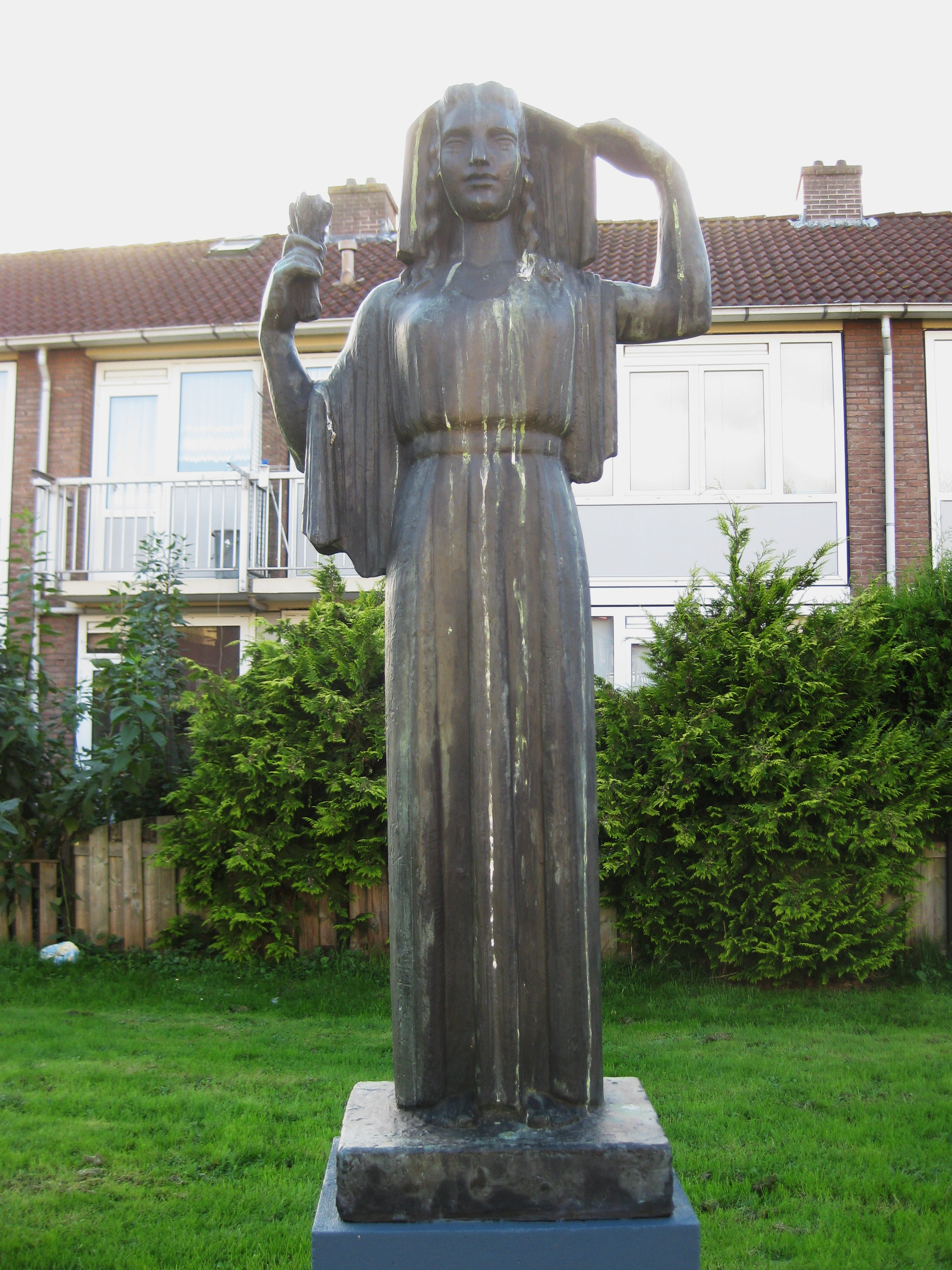
Kora by Johan Limpers for which he won the Prix de Rome in 1940

- 1929 Cornelia Catharina Maria Heslenfeld (sculpture)
- 1931 Hans van der Kop (painting)
- 1932 Dick K. Broos (monumental painting)
- 1932 Nel Klaassen (monumental sculpture)
- 1933 Kuno Brinks (graphic art)
- 1934 Gerrit Bolhuis (sculpture)
- 1936 Wessel Couzijn (monumental sculpture)
- 1937 Daniël Cornelis (Niel) Steenbergen (sculpture)
- 1940 A. van der Weijden (monumental painting); Johan Limpers for Kora (monumental sculpture)
- 1941 Piet H. Schoenmakers (graphic art)
- 1942 J. Rozendael (painting)
- 1947 Marius de Leeuw (monumental painting); Cor Hund (sculpture)
- 1948 Johannes Bernardus (Jan) Sleper (graphic art)
- 1949 Pieter Defesche (painting); Emma Beatrice Haije (sculpture)
- 1951 Auke Hettema for blind and seeing man (sculpture)
- 1952 Erik Thorn Leeson (graphic art)
- 1953 Adriaan J. B. Dekkers for scene from Epic of Gilgamesh; Hans IJdo for woman harvesting grain (sculpture)
- 1955 Ada Dekker (monumental painting); Ek van Zanten (sculpture)
- 1957 Emmy Eerdmans (painting)
- 1959 Nico Rolle (monumental painting) : Gooitzen de Jong (monumental sculpture)
- 1961 Nico Bakker (painting) : Frank Letterie (sculpture)
- 1963 David de Goede (monumental sculpture)
- 1965 Cokkie du Mortier (painting); Jan Spiering (sculpture)
- 1969 Hélène Gregoire-Sterk (painting); Henriëtte Elisabeth Schepp (sculpture)
- 1972 Lau Heidendael (graphic art)
- 1973 Janneke Tangelder (painter); Els van Rees for Het lessen van de dorst (sculpture)
- 1975 Tony van de Vorst (sculptor)
- 1976 Philip Boas (graphic art)
- 1977 Arie Schippers (painting) : Ellie Hahn (sculpture)
- 1979 Catrien van Amstel (monumental sculpture)
- 1980 Edu Kisman (graphic art)
- 1981 Kees Voorbraak (painting)
- 1983 Marie van Leeuwen (painting)
- 1984 Marjo Postma for a series of linocuts (graphic art)
- 1985 Marien Schouten (painting); Leo Vroegindeweij (sculpture)
- 1987 Jan van de Pavert for Inversie (Inversion) (sculpture); Jan Van Den Dobbelsteen won the Prix de Rome Art & Public Space prize
- 1988 Erik Andriesse (graphic art); Brian Meijers (graphic design)
- 1989 Betty van Haaster (painting)
- 1992 Karin Arink (sculpture); Suchan Kinoshita won the Prix de Rome Art & Public Space prize
- 1993 Paul Klemann (drawing); Hewald Jongenelis for Plan voor bronbemaling (graphic art)
- 1994 Ed Gebski (painting); Ida Lohman for De Linnenkast (The Linen Closet) (Theatre & Visual Arts)
- 1996 Paul Kooiker (photography)
- 1997 Femke Schaap for De terugkeer van de kolossale man (The return of the gigantic man) (sculpture); Alicia Framis for The Walking Monument (Art & Public Space)
- 1998 Paul Nassenstein (drawing); Agata Zwierzyñska for Listen, the Telephonebook (graphic art)
- 1999 Charlotte Schleiffert (painting); Cees Krijnen for The art of Divorce (Theatre & Visual Arts)
- 2002 Elspeth Diederix (photography); Igor Sevcuk for the film Beyond Language (Film & Video)
- 2003 Ryan Gander for Bauhaus Revisited (sculpture); James Beckett for A Partial Museum of Noise (Art & Public Space)
- 2004 Mariana Castillo Deball for The Institute of Chance (Drawing & Printed Art)
- 2005 Lonnie van Brummelen for the film Lefkosia (Visual Arts)
- 2007 Viviane Sassen for Ultra Violet photography series (Visual Arts)
- 2009 Nicoline van Harskamp for The Art of Listening (Visual Arts)
- 2011 Pilvi Takala for Broad Sense (Visual Arts)
- 2013 Falke Pisano for Prison Work (Visual Arts)
- 2015 Magali Reus for Leaves (Visual Arts)
- 2017 Rana Hamadeh for The Ten Murders of Josephine (Visual Arts)
- 2019 Rory Pilgrim for The Undercurrent (Visual Arts)
- 2021 Alexis Blake for rock to jolt [ ] stagger to ash (Visual Arts)
- 2023 Jonas Staal for Empire's Island (Visual Arts)

== See also ==
- List of European art awards
