= Bolhuis =

Bolhuis is a Dutch surname. Notable people with the surname include:

- André Bolhuis (born 1946), Dutch field hockey player
- Gerrit Bolhuis (1907–1975), Dutch sculptor
- Peter Bolhuis (born 1954), Dutch actor
