= Woutherus Mol =

Dutch painter (1785–1857)

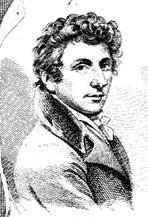
- Born: 21 March 1785; Haarlem
- Died: 30 August 1857 (aged 72); Haarlem

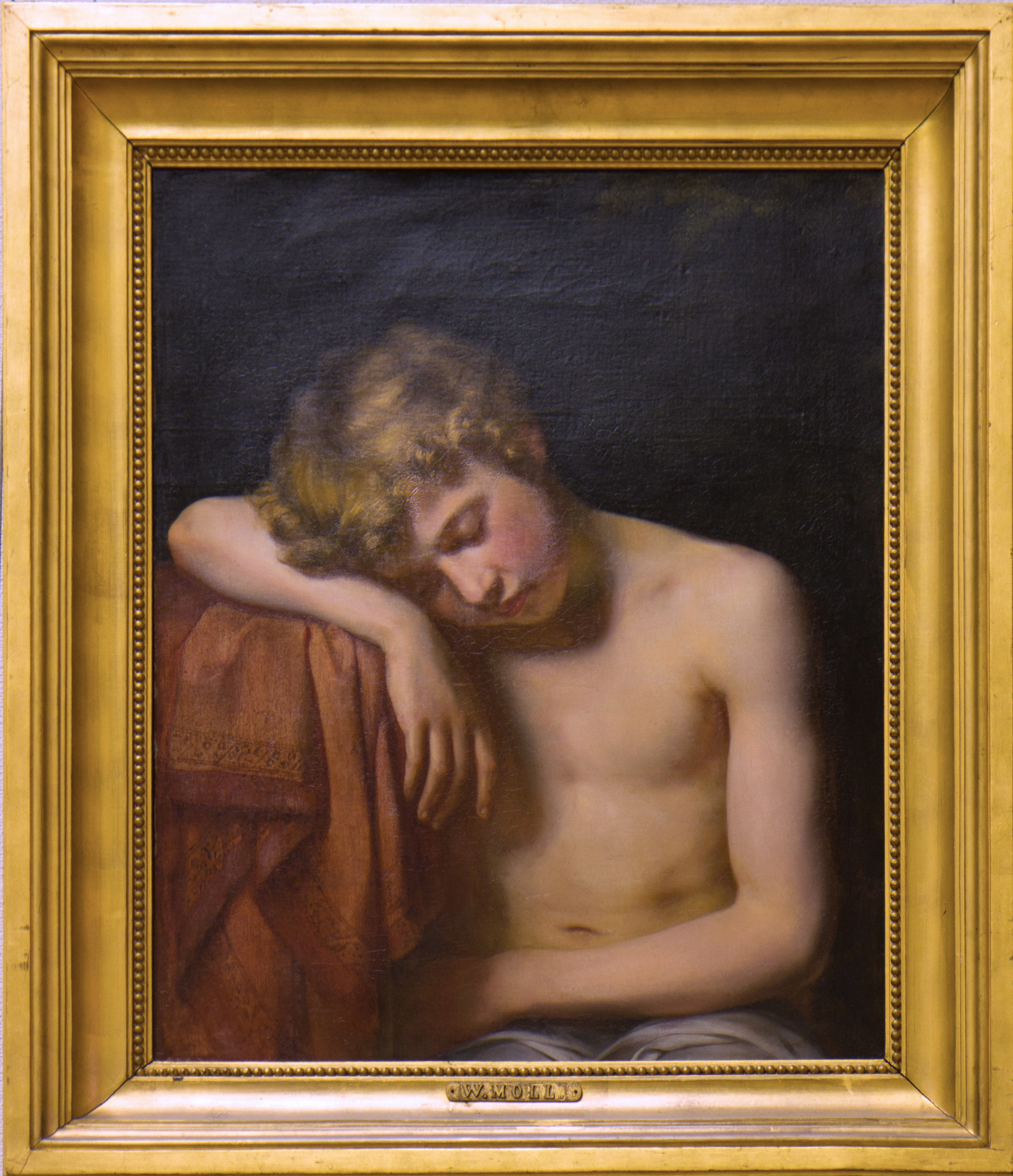
Sleeping boy at the Teylers Museum

Woutherus Mol (21 March 1785 – 30 August 1857) was a painter and draftsman from the Netherlands. He is known for interiors and genre scenes.

== Biography ==
Once Mol chose to make art his livelihood, he was tutored by the Haarlem painter Hermanus van Brussel. In 1802 he became a member of the Haarlem drawing society "Tekengenootschap Kunstmin en Vlijt". After he got excited about the Paris Art Museum where many master pieces resided, he obtained permission from his parents and moved to Paris in 1806, provided with recommendations for the floral painter Gerard van Spaendonck who taught at the institute in Paris. But since Mol showed much more interest in historical paintings, he took lessons from Jacques-Louis David (the famous historical painter who also taught there) and in 1807 he was awarded the Dutch Prix de Rome from King Louis Napoleon of Holland and received a scholarship as "Hollandsch Kweekeling" (Hollandic pupil) to study and work in Paris. Since one of the requirements for this scholarship was that he would send in some of his work to exhibitions, his painting of the Holy Family (after Raphael) was exhibited in 1810 in the Amsterdam art exhibition. In Paris he built up a life as a painter and he never used the scholarship to actually visit and study in Rome.

After the restoration of the Netherlands in 1813, he returned to his home town Haarlem where he further developed his talent by studying the Dutch masters, for which the Amsterdam museum offered him plenty of opportunity. In 1818 he made his name with his submission to the Amsterdam art exhibition named "The Death of Prince William I", based on the only known portrait taken of Prince William I on his deathbed (surrounded by his family and important figures of the time) by Christiaen Jansz van Bieselingen. This was his first submission that was truly original and not mainly a copy of an existing masterpiece.

Already during the exhibition the painting was popular, and 1000 guilders was offered for it. This painting was finally purchased by the mother of the king for 1800 florins to give as a present to her daughter-in-law. Due mostly to this success, he became an honorary member of the Royal Academy of Brussels (Koninklijke Academie voor Schone Kunsten te Brussel). Even though he submitted multiple portraits during that very exhibition, this excellent work also caused rumors about his (lack of) portraiture abilities since it was not entirely by his own hand. In 1826 he was admitted as member of the Koninklijk Instituut as a correspondent in the fourth class.

His later works were considered to be of inferior quality, and public opinion turned against him, though his friends continued to encourage him. Mol had a nervous breakdown, and in 1846 he entered the "Rooms-Katholieke Wees- en armenhuis" (the Catholic almshouse, or "Diaconie", which building is currently in use as a police station) in Haarlem, where he died in 1857. During this last decade of his life he no longer painted. The Teylers Museum in Haarlem has one of his works, entitled Sleeping boy.
