= Nel Klaassen =

Dutch artist

- Born: Petronella Helene Klaassen; 21 October 1906; Arnhem, Netherlands
- Died: 30 September 1989 (aged 82); Heemstede, Netherlands
- Other name: Nel Bouhuys-Klaassen
- Known for: Sculpture
- Spouse: Jaap Bouhuys (m. 1958; died in 1983)

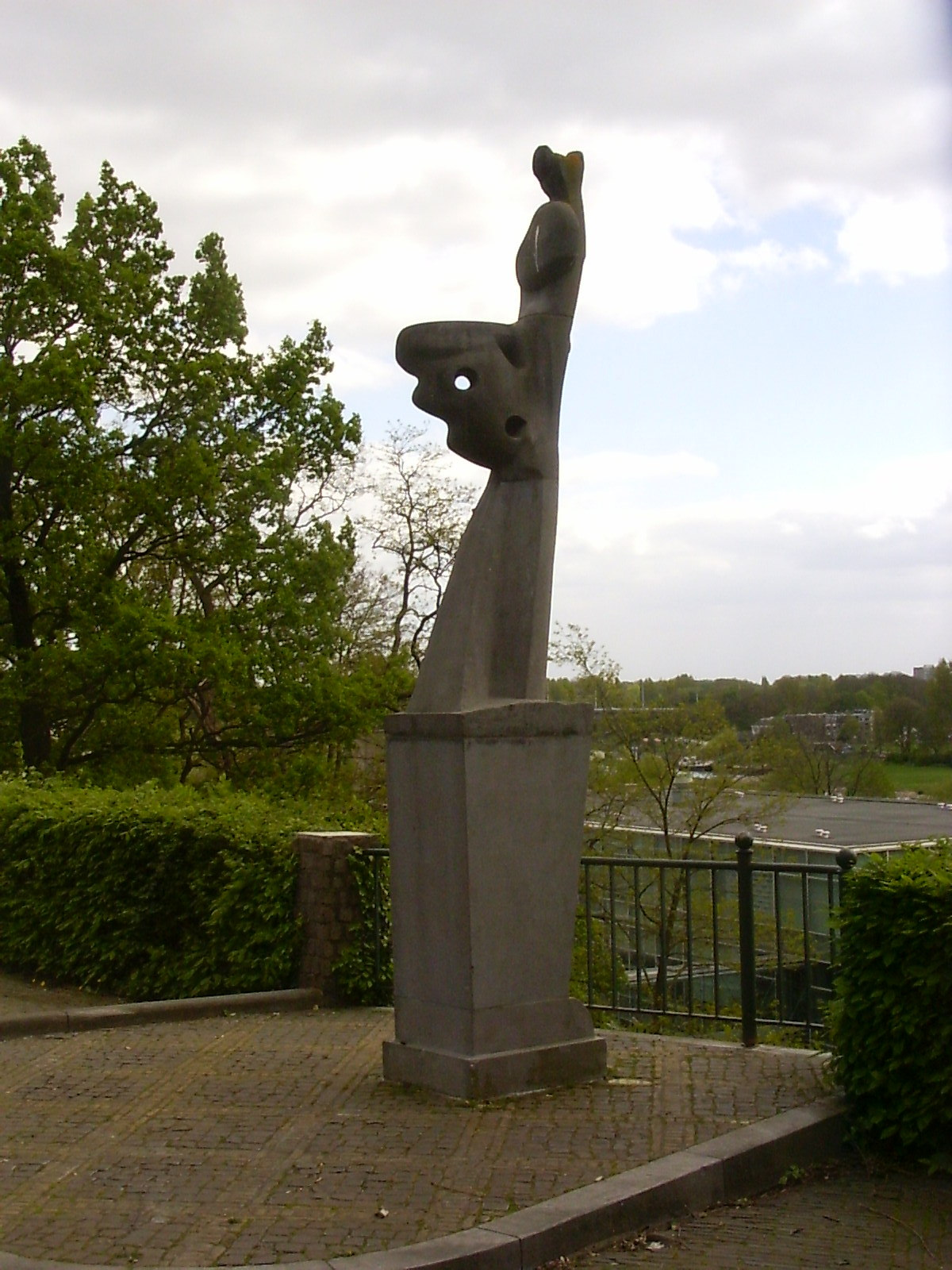
The woman in wartime, 1949, Nel Klaassen

Petronella "Nel" Helene Klaassen (1906-1989) was a Dutch sculptor.

== Biography ==
Klaassen was born on 21 October 1906 in Arnhem. She studied at the Rijksakademie van beeldende kunsten (State Academy of Fine Arts) in Amsterdam. She was taught by Jan Bronner, Gijs Jacobs van den Hof and Richard Roland Holst. In 1932 Klaassen won a Prix de Rome for monumental and decorative sculpture. She used the prize to study in Rome and to travel to London and Paris.

In 1934 she settled in Amsterdam with fellow artist Jaap Bouhuys (1902-1983). The couple eventually married in 1958. They worked together and the couple also collaborated with the architect Gijsbert Friedhoff. Klaassen received commissions throughout the 1930s. Klaassen's work was included in the 1939 exhibition and sale Onze Kunst van Heden (Our Art of Today) at the Rijksmuseum in Amsterdam.

In 1949 Klaassen was chosen to create a monument in Arnhem honoring women in wartime. Critics complained that the image was too modern and unfeminine. She continued receiving commissions for monuments, mosaics, tapestries, and murals through the 1950s and 1960s, and 1970s, including a mural for the Electrical Engineering building at the Delft University of Technology. She also exhibited with Sonsbeek and Sint Lucas.

Klaassen died on 30 September 1989 in Heemstede.

== Gallery ==
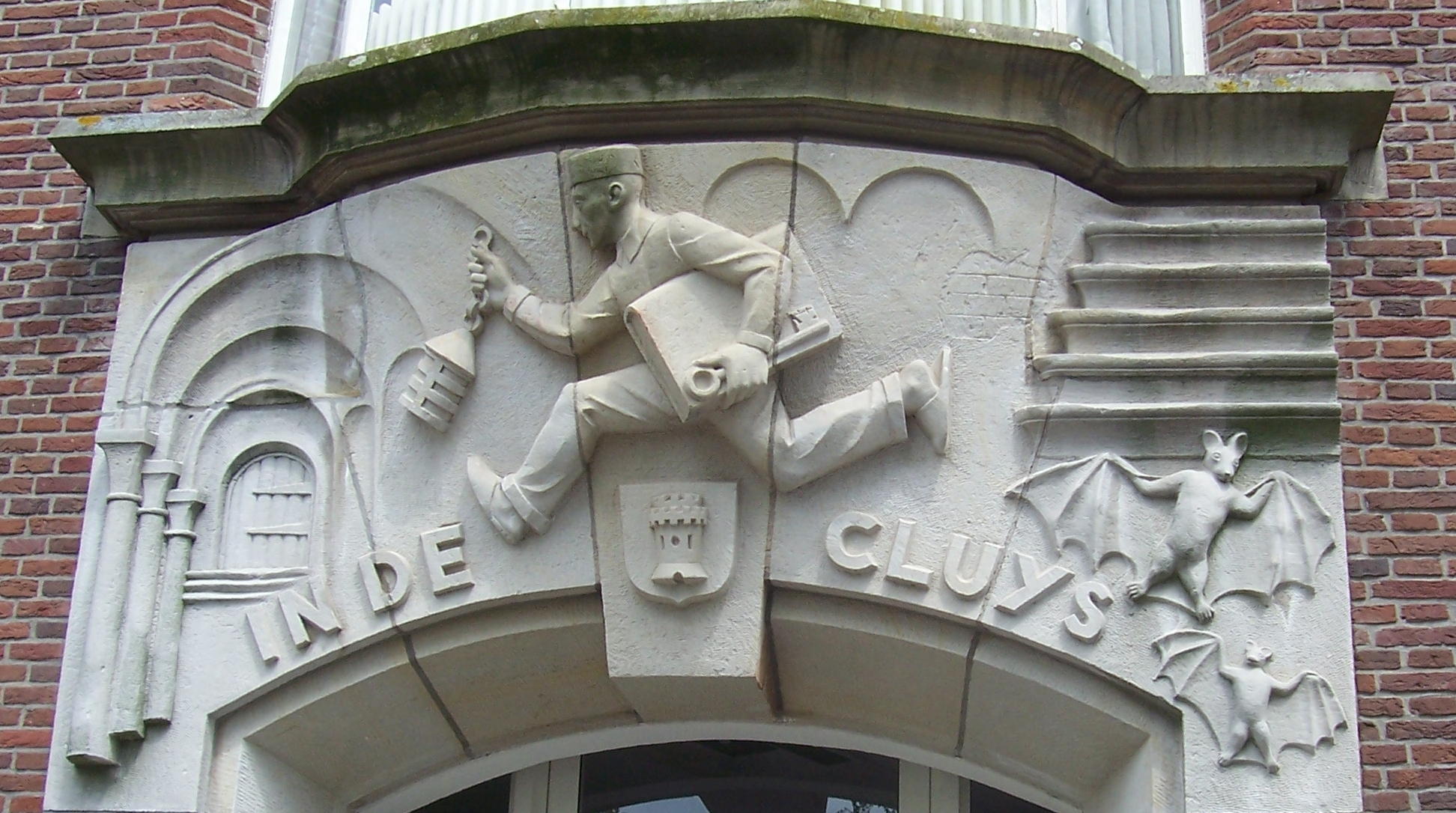
Facade relief In de Cluys, 1942, Nel Klaassen, Markt Middelburg, above bank.

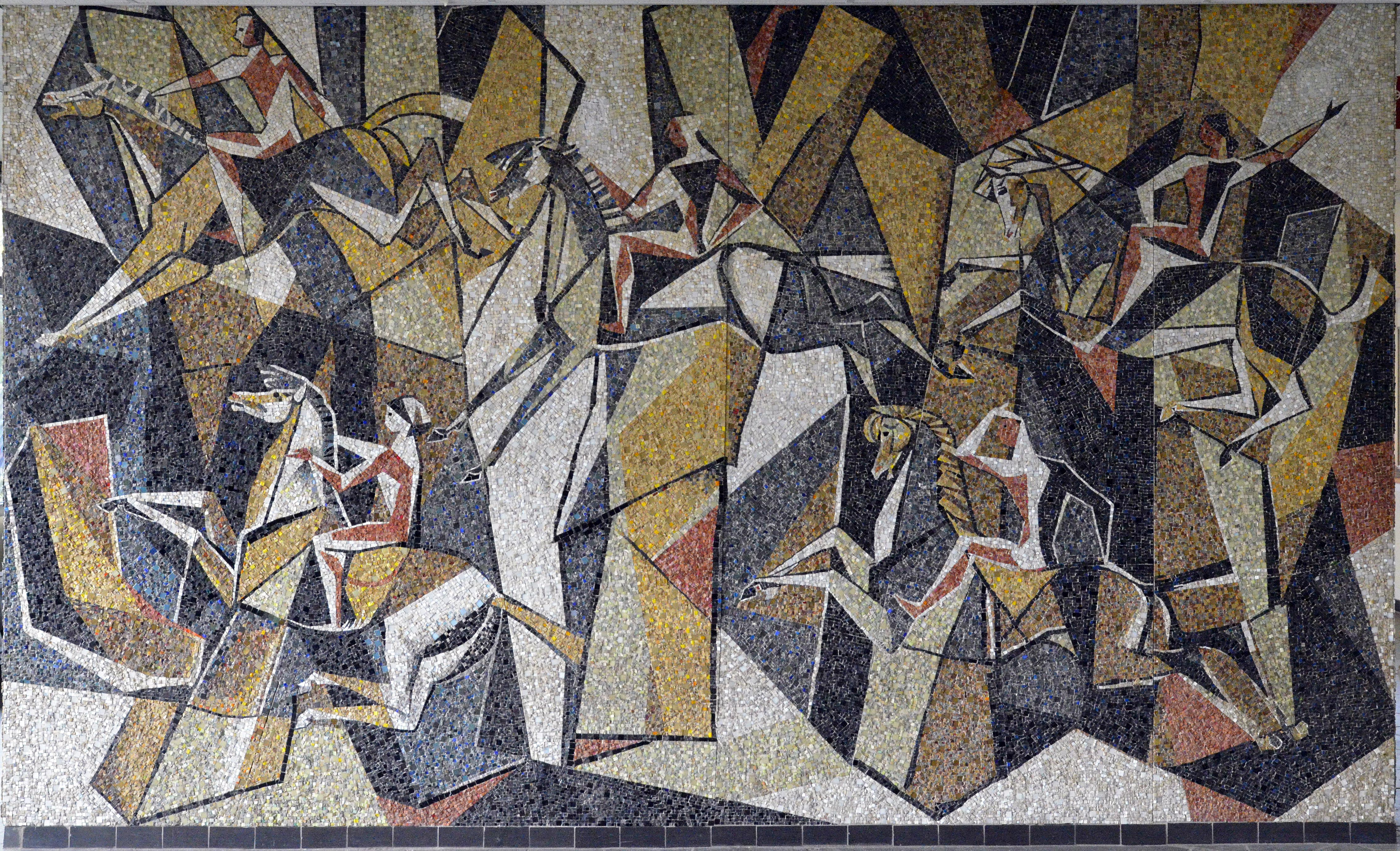
Mosaic in the hall of the Lorentz building, Nel Klaassen
