= Niel Steenbergen =

Dutch painter

Daniël Cornelis "Niel" Steenbergen (Steenbergen, 18 April 1911 – Oosterhout, 8 March 1997) was a Dutch artist, especially known as sculptor, painter and medalist.

Steenbergen studied at the School of Applied Arts in Tilburg (1929–1932), the Higher Institute for Fine Arts in Antwerp (1932–1934) and the National Academy of Fine Arts in Amsterdam (1935–1938). He was active as a sculptor, medalist, designer and goldsmith. He succeeded his teacher Gerard Bourgonjon at the Academy in Tilburg. His works include war memorials, free images, altars, pulpits, fonts and pontificalia.

In 1945 he founded the Free Academy of Visual Art in Breda, together with the Dutch artists Dio Rovers and Gerrit de Morée.

He was affiliated with a number of artists' associations, including the North Brabant Association of Visual Artists Jeroen Bosch, Breda (1947–1955), the Brabant Foundation for the Visual Arts and Fine Crafts (1958–1965), Arti et Amicitiae and the Dutch Society of Sculptors. Steenbergen won several awards: the Academy Award Belgium (1935), the Dutch Prix de Rome for Sculpture (1938), and the gold medal at the Salzburg Biennale (1956). In 1989 he received an award from the Dutch province of North Brabant. In 1973 he was appointed by the Queen of the Netherlands Knight of the Order of Orange-Nassau and in 1976 by the Holy See Knight of the Order of St. Gregory the Great.

Steenbergen was married to the icon painter Else Steenbergen-Potjer (1922-2012).

== Literature ==
- Kam, W. van der (1999) Niel Steenbergen Breda: Uitgeverij De Geus. ISBN 978-90-5226-653-4
