= Hermanus van Brussel =

Dutch landscape painter and etcher

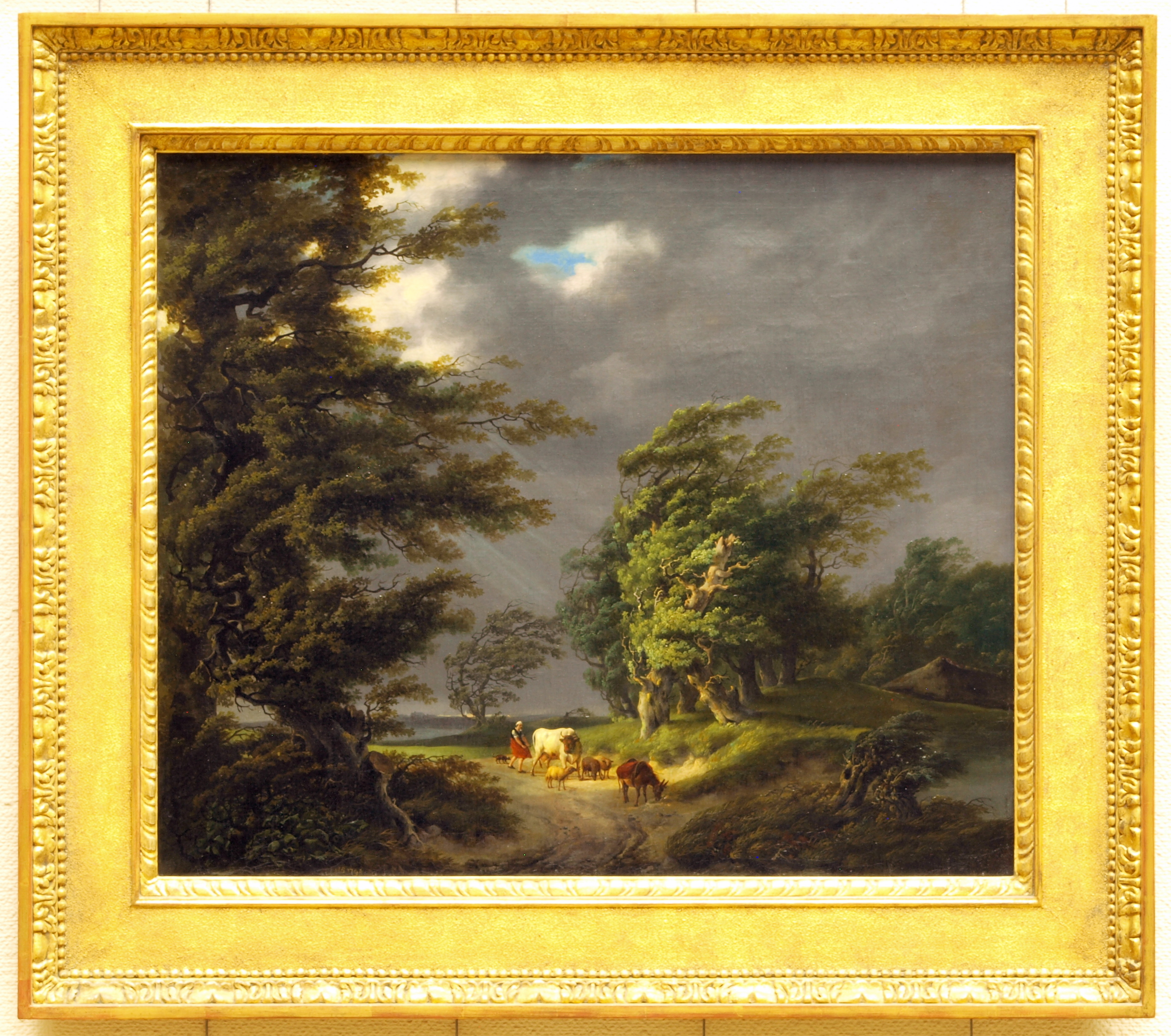
Landscape in stormy weather, 1794, Teylers Museum

Hermanus van Brussel (1763–1815) was a Dutch landscape painter and etcher. Among his best etchings is mentioned a set of twenty-one landscapes with figures.

== Biography ==
He was born in Haarlem. According to the RKD he was a pupil of Johan Bernhard Brandhof, Christiaan Henning and Wybrand Hendriks. He later became the teacher of Woutherus Mol. He died at Utrecht in 1815.

He was known for his set designs for the Amsterdam Theatre and Het Loo Palace. In Haarlem he was a member of the amateur playhouse society "Kunstliefde" and made many set designs for them. Like many Dutch painters of his time, he paid great attention to the skies in his works as the land was often relatively featureless.
