= Suchan Kinoshita =

German-Japanese artist

- スーチャン・キノシタ
- Born: Susanne Margarethe Erika Kinoshita; November 9, 1960 (age 65); Tokyo, Japan
- Education: Hochschule für Musik und Tanz Köln; Jan van Eyck Academie
- Movement: Visual artist
- Awards: Prix de Rome (Netherlands)

Suchan Kinoshita (Japanese: スーチャン・キノシタ; born November 9, 1960) is a German-Japanese visual artist. Her mixed personal and artistic background has heavily influenced her work.

== Early life and education ==
Kinoshita was born November 9, 1960 in Tokyo and grew up in Japan with a German mother and a Japanese father. She studied at the Hochschule für Musik und Tanz Köln (Cologne Academy for Music and Dance) from 1981 to 1985 and the Jan van Eyck Academie in Maastricht from 1998 to 1990. In Cologne she was taught by the contemporary composer Maurizio Fagel.

== Career ==
From 1983 to 1992 she was associated with the Theater am Mariënplatz in Krefeld, where she acted, directed her own plays, and made props. From 1988 to 1990 she studied at the Jan van Eyck Academy in Maastricht and taught a postgraduate study program. In the early 1990s she emerged as a visual artist with the exhibitions De Fabriek, in Eindhoven and Open für N in Krefeld. In 1994–1995 she participated in the PS1 exhibition in New York at the Museum of Modern Art (MoMA). Kinoshita returned to Maastricht to teach in the postgraduate program at the Jan van Eyck Academy. She lives and works in Brussels and Münster, teaching painting at the Münster Academy of Art since 2006, where she is also deputy headmaster.

== Work and themes ==
Kinoshita's work is displayed in many public and private collections, including: Museum Boijmans Van Beuningen, Rotterdam; Bonnefanten Museum, Maastricht; de Vleeshal, Middelburg; Museum Het Domein, Sittard; Chisenhale Gallery, London; Musée d’Art Contemporain, Lyon; Museum of Contemporary Art, Antwerp; and Stedelijk Museum voor Actuele Kunst, Ghent.

Kinoshita grew up between two different cultures and trained in various artistic disciplines. Her work blends elements from her background in experimental music and theater. With her performances and installations, almost all of which are distinctly interdisciplinary, Kinoshita presents the everyday in a different form. Kinoshita herself refers to this as "inbetween." The various themes from her varied background can readily be seen in her oeuvre.

In addition to many solo exhibitions, Suchan Kinoshita has participated in more than 90 international group exhibitions

== Solo exhibitions (selection) ==
Year	Name	Location
1991	De Fabriek (Factory)	De Fabriek, Eindhoven
1991	Open für N (Open for N)	Theater am Marienplatz, Krefeld
1993	Scenario, An Imaginary Piece	Stadsgalerij Heerlen, Heerlen
1995	Stof (Dust)	De Vleeshal, Middelburg
1996	Stuff	White Cube, London
1997	Voorstelling (Performance)	Stedelijk Van Abbemuseum, Eindhoven
1998	Exit	Chisenhale Gallery, London
1998	Meaning is Moist	SMAK - Stedelijk Museum voor Actuele Kunst, Ghent
1999	Parallele oder Hannah, wie man sie auch nennt (Parallel or Hannah, as she is also called)	Städtisches Museum Abteiberg, Mönchengladbach
2000	0031-43-3438746	Shiseido Gallery, Tokyo
2002	Het moet dinsdag ochtend zijn geweest (He wanted to see you this day)	Ellen de Bruijne Projects, Amsterdam
2002–2003	First marriage	M HKA, Antwerp
2006	Yukkurikosso yoi (The slower, the better)	Nadja Vilenne Gallery, Liège
2006–2007	Das Fragment an sich (The Fragment in Itself)	Ikon Gallery, Birmingham
2007	Luidspreker (Loudspeaker ) Plug In#14	Van Abbemuseum, Eindhoven
2007	Skulptur Projekte (Sculpture Projects) "Chinese Whipsers"	Schauraum der Handwerkskammer, Münster
2010	COMMA 25	Bloomberg Space, London
2010	In 10 Minuten (In 10 Minutes)	Museum Ludwig, Cologne
2011	The Right Moment at the Wrong Place	Museum de Paviljoens, Almere
2011	Stick Empathy	MUDAM, Luxembourg
2011	Suchan Kinoshita	Ellen de Bruijne Projects, Amsterdam
2013	Taking Place	Hidde van Seggelen Gallery, London
2014	Tokonoma , Ludlow 38	Goethe-Institut, New York
2015	Operation Theatre (series of events)	Institut de Carton, Brussels
2023	Architektonische Psychodramen (Architectural psychodramas)	PAKT, Amsterdam

== Group exhibitions (selection) ==
Year	Name	Location
1995	Orientation - 4th International Biennale	Various locations, Istanbul
1996	Manifesta 1	Various Museums, Rotterdam
1997	Truce: Echoes of art in an Age of Endless Conclusions	Site, Santa Fé
1998	Statement Art 29	Art Basel, Basel
2007	8th Biennale de Sharjah (Sharjah Biennial 8), Still Life - Art, Ecology, and the Politics of Chang	Sharjah Art Museum and various venues, Dubai
2010	Suchan Kinoshita	Today Art Museum, Beijing
2010–2011	KUB Arena – On Performance	Ruth Buchanan, Simon Fujiwara, Suchan Kinoshita, Falke Pisano, Ian White: Kooperative für Darstellungspolitik (Cooperative for Representational Politics), Kunsthaus Bregenz
2011	Impossible Community	Moscow Museum of Modern Art (MMOMA), Moscow
2012	Beyond Imagination	Stedelijk Museum, Amsterdam
2012	The Collection XXXII – Personality Test + The Book Lovers	MuHKA Museum voor Hedendaagse Kunst, Antwerp
2012	EXTRA MUROS: Traces. Similarities and dissonances	Kringloopcentrale, Antwerp
2016	Art Brussels 2016	Nadja Vilenne Gallery, Brussels
2016	Behind the curtain. Concealment and Revelation since the Renaissance. From Titian to Christ.	Museum Kunstpalast, Düsseldorf
2016	See how the land lays	West in Huis Huguetan, The Hague
2016	Tokonoma in From A to K	Museum M, Leuven
2017	Superdemocracy – The Senate of Things	de Senaat, Brussels
2018	EXTRA MUROS: Geel - Middle Gate II - The Story of Dymphna	City of Geel
2018	Freedom - The Fifty Key Dutch Artworks Since 1968	Museum de Fundatie, Zwolle
2021–2022	EURASIA - A Landscape of Mutability	M HKA, Antwerp
2022	Risquons-Tout	Wiels, Brussels

== Prizes ==
Year	Prize	Notes
1992	Prix de Rome (Netherlands)	Rijksakademie, Netherlands
1999	Edmond Hustinx Prize for Visual Arts	Edmond Hustinx Foundation, Netherlands
2010	Fine Arts Prize	Das Kuratorium der Kunststoffindustrie, Germany
2025	BelgianArtPrize	La Jeune Peinture Belge - De Jonge Belgische Schilderkuns, Belgium
