= Jan van de Pavert =

Dutch artist (born 1960)

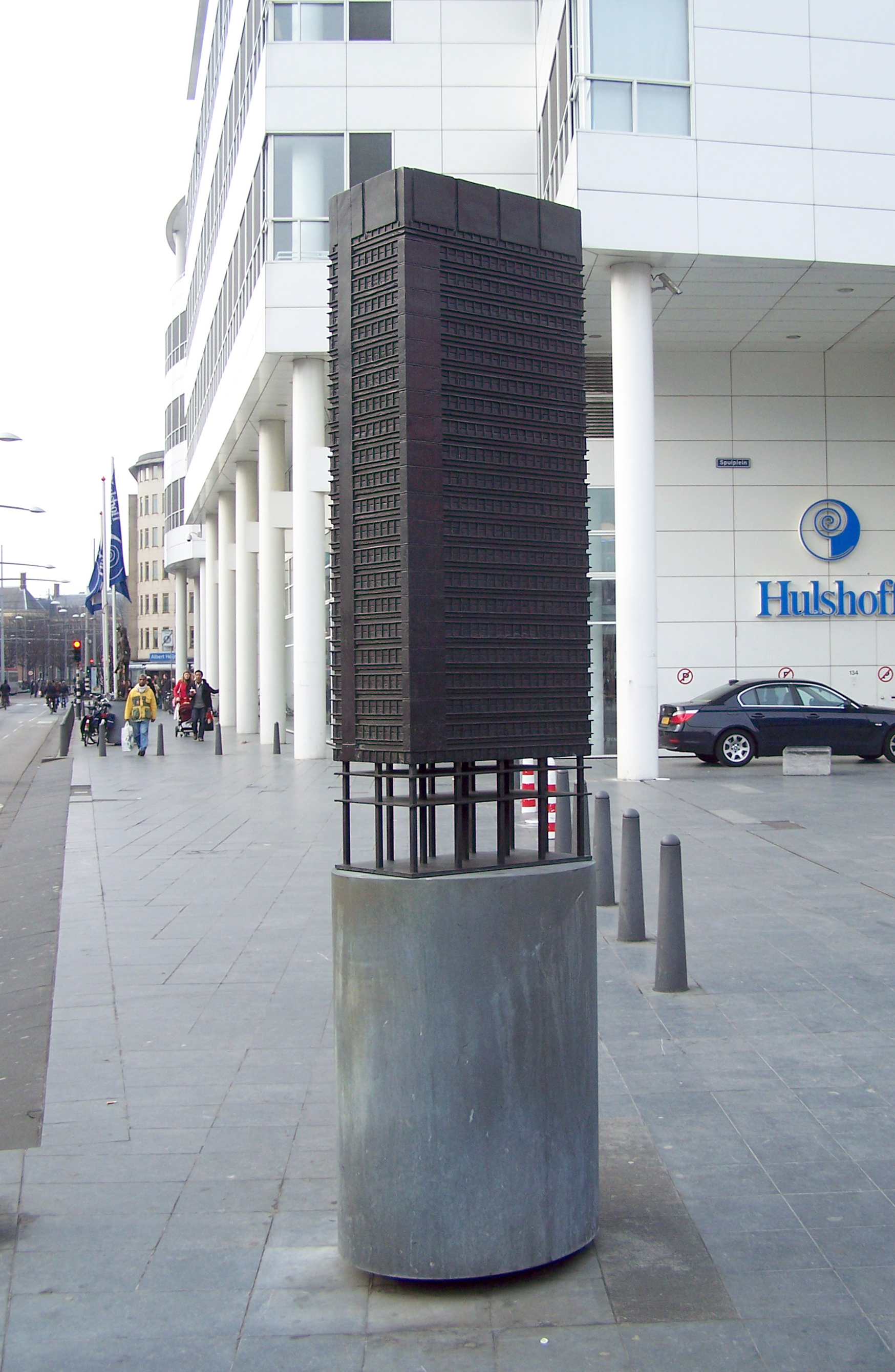
Sculpture "Ministerie" made by Jan van de Pavert in 2004. Placed at the Spui in The Hague, part of the Sokkelplan.

Johannes Antonius van de van de Pavert (born May 10, 1960) is a Dutch artist, working as sculptor, painter, draftsman, animator, and video artist.

== Life and work ==
Born in Zeist, Van de Pavert was educated at the AKV St. Joost in Breda) from 1979 to 1982, where he was lecturer by Hans van Zummeren and Theo Mols. From 1982 to 1984 he studied at Ateliers '63 in Haarlem, with among others Stanley Brouwn and Carel Visser. At the Ateliers '63 his work developed "from painting to spatial work took place, where the dialogue between silence and cacophony began."

Van de Pavert settled as independent artist in Amsterdam in 1987. In 1989 he moved to Utrecht, where he worked until 1997. Since 2009 he is working in Rotterdam.

According to Van Kooten (1991) "at a cursory glance Jan van de Pavert's works call everyday objects to mind: rather than sculptures they are elements like a door, a window or a cupboard. However, on closer scrutiny of these elements one discovers references to norms and images. Yes, they do turn out to be... an empty space on the paper."

Van de Pavert was awarded the Prix de Rome in 1987 for his sculpture Inversie (Inversion), the Dr A.H. Heineken Prize for Art in 1998, and the 2015: Jeanne Oosting Prize for watercolors in 2015.

== Selected publications ==
- Association pour l'art contemporain (Nevers) (1988), Jan Van de Pavert: Sculptures Et Dessins : [exposition, Nevers, APAC, Centre D'art Contemporain, 18 Juin-23 Juillet 1988].
- Jan van de Pavert (1991). Jan van de Pavert: voor de spiegel.
- Mark Kremer, Jan van de Pavert, Stedelijk Van Abbemuseum (1994), Jan van de Pavert: Stedelijk Van Abbemuseum 30/4 - 5/6/1994.
- Jan van de Pavert et al. Jan Van de Pavert: Untiteld/zonder Titel, 1996
