= Ed Gebski =

Dutch painter (born 1959)

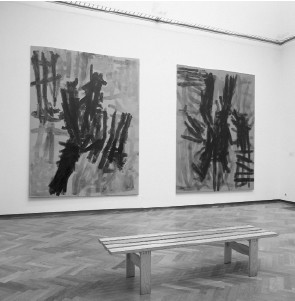

Ed Gebski is an artist from Amsterdam (born 1959 in Heerlen). His monumental canvasses are created in a darkroom where he works with silver-nitrate/oil paint. Only when the paintings are exposed to light do they reveal their colour and presentation. This process is akin to the development of photographs. The paint emulsion is removed after the painting process and then transparent colours remain on the canvas.

In 1994 Gebski won the first prize at the Dutch Prix de Rome. His work also was part of the exposition "Tot zo ver / Up to now", Stedelijk Museum Amsterdam at the end of December 2003.

== Bibliography ==
=== 1994 ===
Koninklijke Subsidie voor vrije Schilderkunst, 1994, (cat)

Boogerd, Dominic van den, ’De mentale ruimte van de Prix de Rome’, HP/De Tijd, 23-10-1994.

Sütö, Wilma, Wel het gezicht, niet de ziel, De Volkskrant, 8 November 1994

Terborch, Lusette, 'Ed Gebski: 'Nonsens dat de schilderkunst op de intensive care ligt', NRC handelsblad, 10 November 1996.

Tegenbosch, Pietje, 'Prix de Rome, 12 November 1994.

Radio; Kunst & Cultuur -AVRO, vrijdag 18 November 1994.

Ophef en Vertier-VPRO Radio, Stedelijk Museum, Ed Gebski in gesprek met Joost Zwagerman.

TV: Kunstmest, NPS, Cultura, Gesprek met Ed Gebski

=== 1995 ===
Prix de Rome first prize for painting’ 94 (cat.)

Sütö, Wilma, De Volkskrant,’Couleur Locale’. 1-4-1995

Pieters, Din, NRC Handelsblad, ‘Galerie’, 12-5-1995

Fuchs, Rudi, Selected works from the collection of the ABN AMRO Bank, (cat)

=== 1996 ===
Hoet, Jan, De Rode poort, Luc Martens, Jan Hoet, Hans Martens, (cat) Rode Poort.

Depont, Paul, DE RODE POORT, De Volkskrant, donderdag 14 November 1996.

Sütö, Wilma, De Volkskrant, 'De olifant van de blinden', vrijdag 15 November 1996.

Hove, Jan, 'Puin en Parels in De Rode Poort', 15 November 1996.

De Standaard, 8 November 1996.

Velden, Ben van, 'Hier wordt energie samengebalt' NRC handelsblad, 8 November 1996.

Braet, Jan, 'Plaatsen van belang' 'Verzonken zelfportretten van Ed Gebski', Knack 27/4, 22 januari 1997.

Radio; Opium, AVRO, Live radio, interview Ed Gebski met Petra Possel en Matthijs van Nieuwkerk.

=== 1997 ===
Sütö, Wilma, Koninklijke Subsidie voor vrije Schilderkunst, 1997, (cat).

Romijn, Catharien, 'De Wonderlijke wereld van een hedendaagse alchimist', Limburgs dagblad, 15 oktober 1997.

Jansen, Peter, 'Anders onder de douche vandaan', Dagblad de Limburger, 16 oktober 1997.

=== 1998 ===
Tegenbosch, Pietje, 'Walking the tightrope', 'Het Zwarte Licht' 1998, Burret, T. (cat)

Terborch, Lusette, Ed Gebski in Galerie Loerakker, De Volkskrant, donderdag 8 oktober 1998.

Vermeijden, Marianne, 'Ed Gebski Het Zwarte Licht', 16 oktober 1998.

=== 2003 ===
Terborch, Lusette, ' De heksenkring van Rudi Fuchs', -Een afscheidstentoonstelling als zelfportret-, Vrij Nederland, 3 mei 2003.

=== 2004 ===
Spijkerman, Sandra, Trouw, Schilderen in de doka, 18 maart 2004.

=== 2006 ===
Fuchs, Rudi, Aanwinsten, (cat). Stedelijk Museum Amsterdam, NL.
