= Frederik Engel Jeltsema =

Dutch painter and sculptor

Frederick Engel (Fre) Jeltsema (Uithuizen, 4 October 1879 - The Hague, 16 February 1971) was a Dutch painter and sculptor.

Because of a medical uncertainty at birth, Jeltsema was registered as a girl in the municipality's population registry. This was administratively corrected in 1906.

In 1892–1896 Jeltsema followed a course at the Minerva Academy in Groningen. He then followed an initial training for drawing teacher, but opted for training as a sculptor at the Rijksakademie van beeldende kunsten in Amsterdam (1899–1902). In 1902 he won the Dutch Prix de Rome.
