= Pandering =

Pandering may refer to:

- Pandering (politics), the expression of one's views in a manner that appeals to voters
- Procuring (prostitution), the facilitation of a prostitute
