= Pier Pander =

Dutch artist

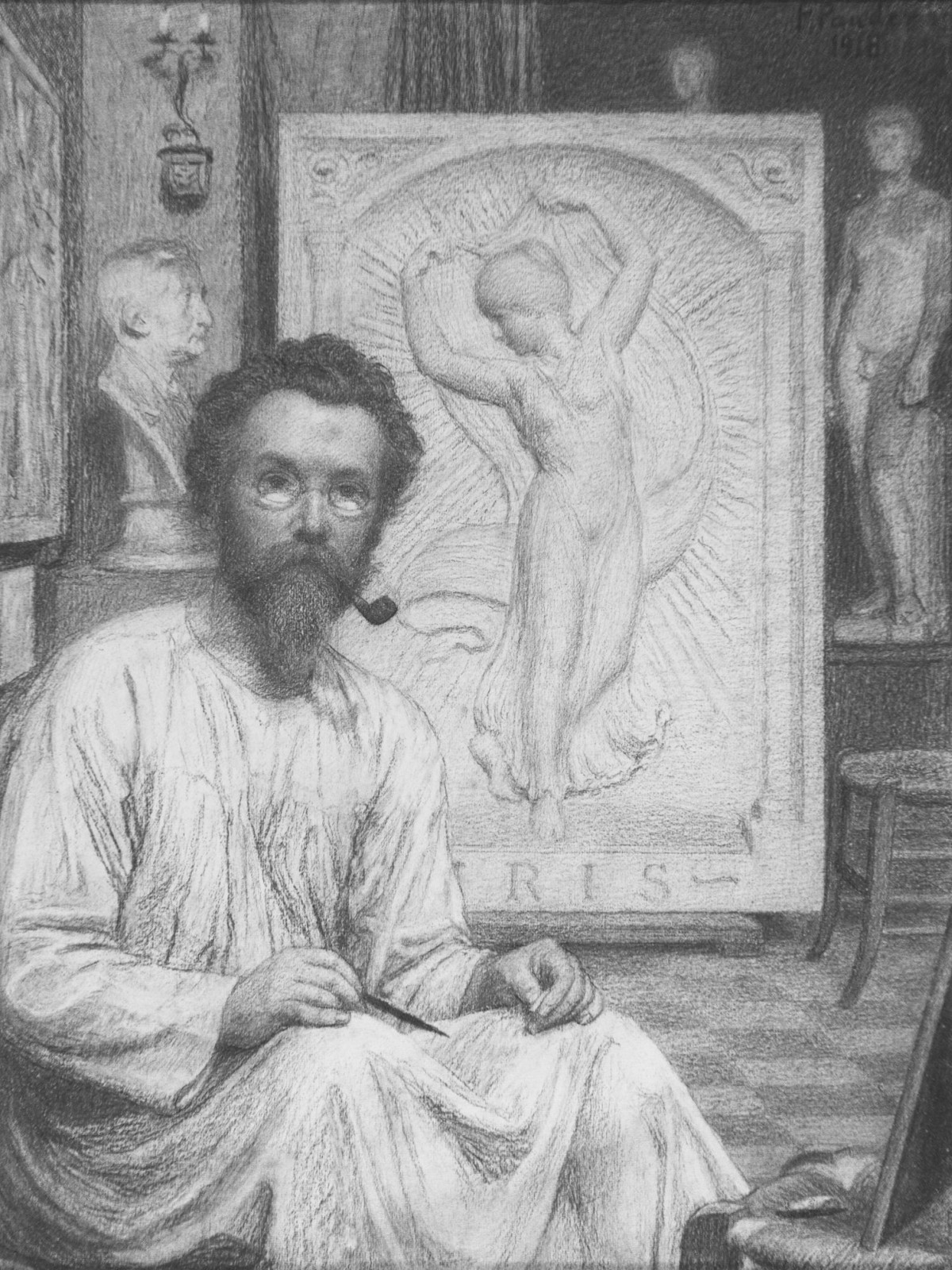
Self-portrait by Pier Pander (1918)

Jacobs Pier Pander (20 June 1864 – 6 September 1919) was a Dutch sculptor and designer of medals.

Pander was born in Drachten in the Dutch northern province of Friesland. He was the son of a poor boatman. At a young age, his talent for woodcarving was recognised. Wealthy patrons enabled him to study at the Kunstnijverheidsschool Quellinus in Amsterdam (an art school) and later at the Académie des Beaux Arts in Paris.

In 1885 Pander won the Dutch Prix de Rome for sculpture, but a serious illness disabled him. He moved to Rome in 1893, where he set up a studio. He frequently travelled to the Netherlands where he became famous for his design of the portrait of Queen Wilhelmina for a Dutch coin in 1898.

Pander was friends with the Dutch writer Louis Couperus, who lived in Nice and Rome between 1900 and 1915.

He eventually died in Rome from the effects of tuberculosis. He is buried in the Protestant Cemetery, Rome.

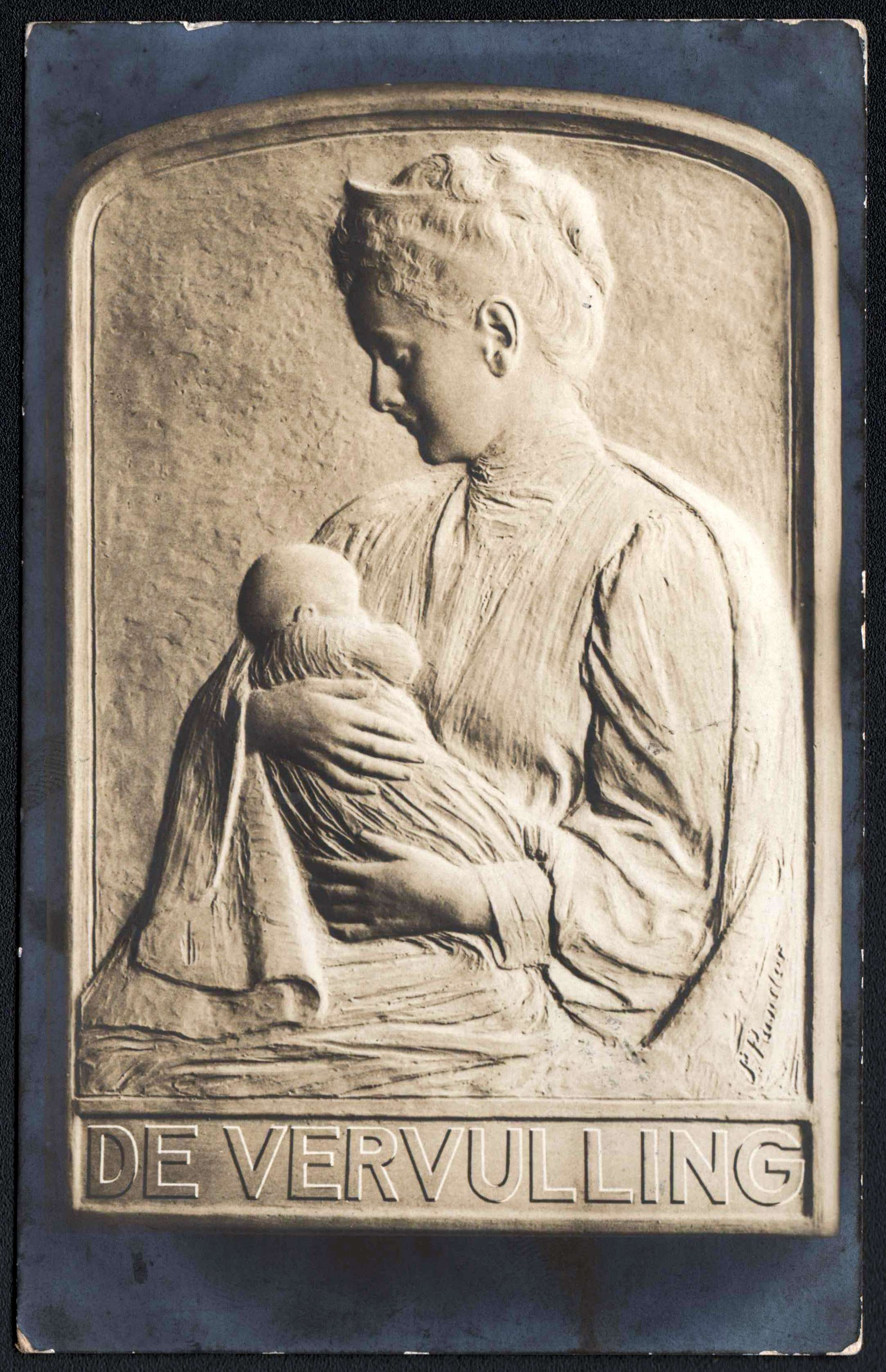

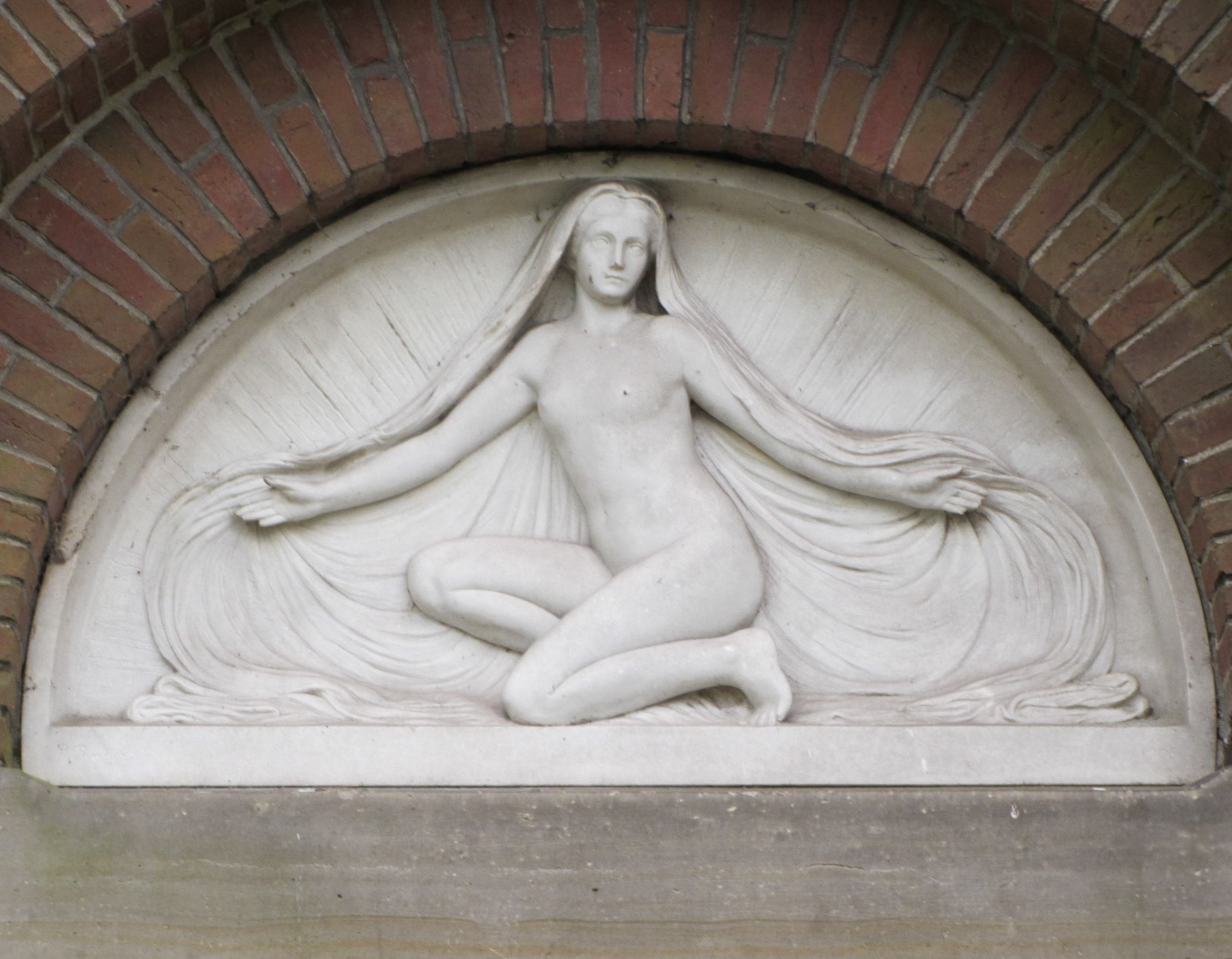

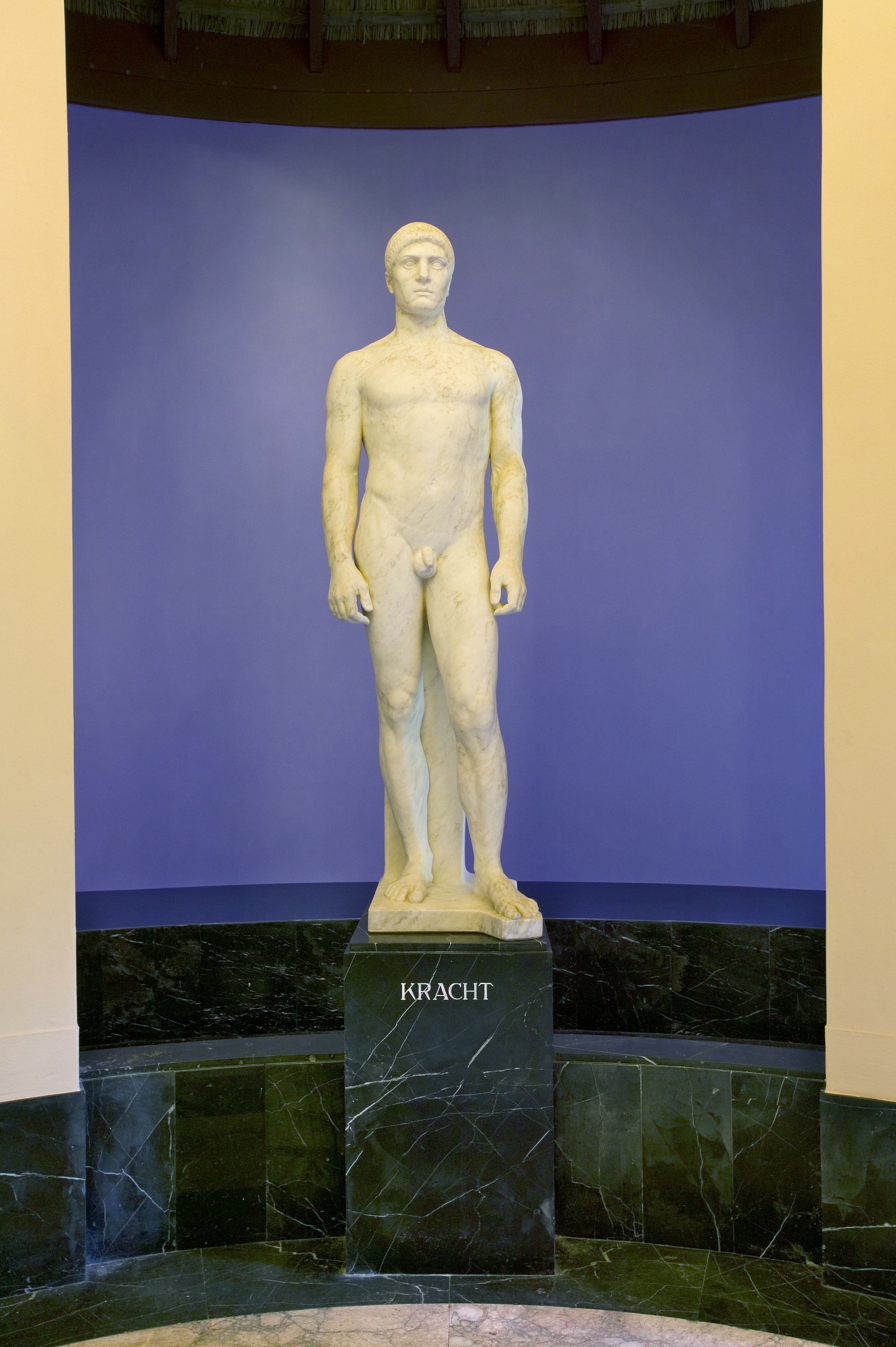

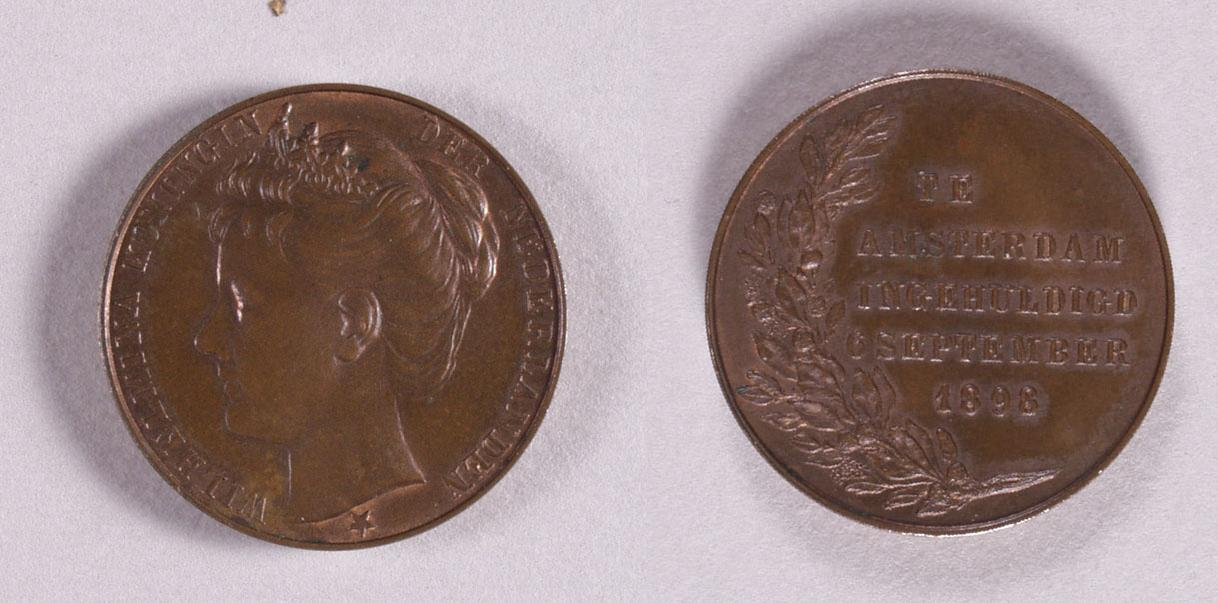

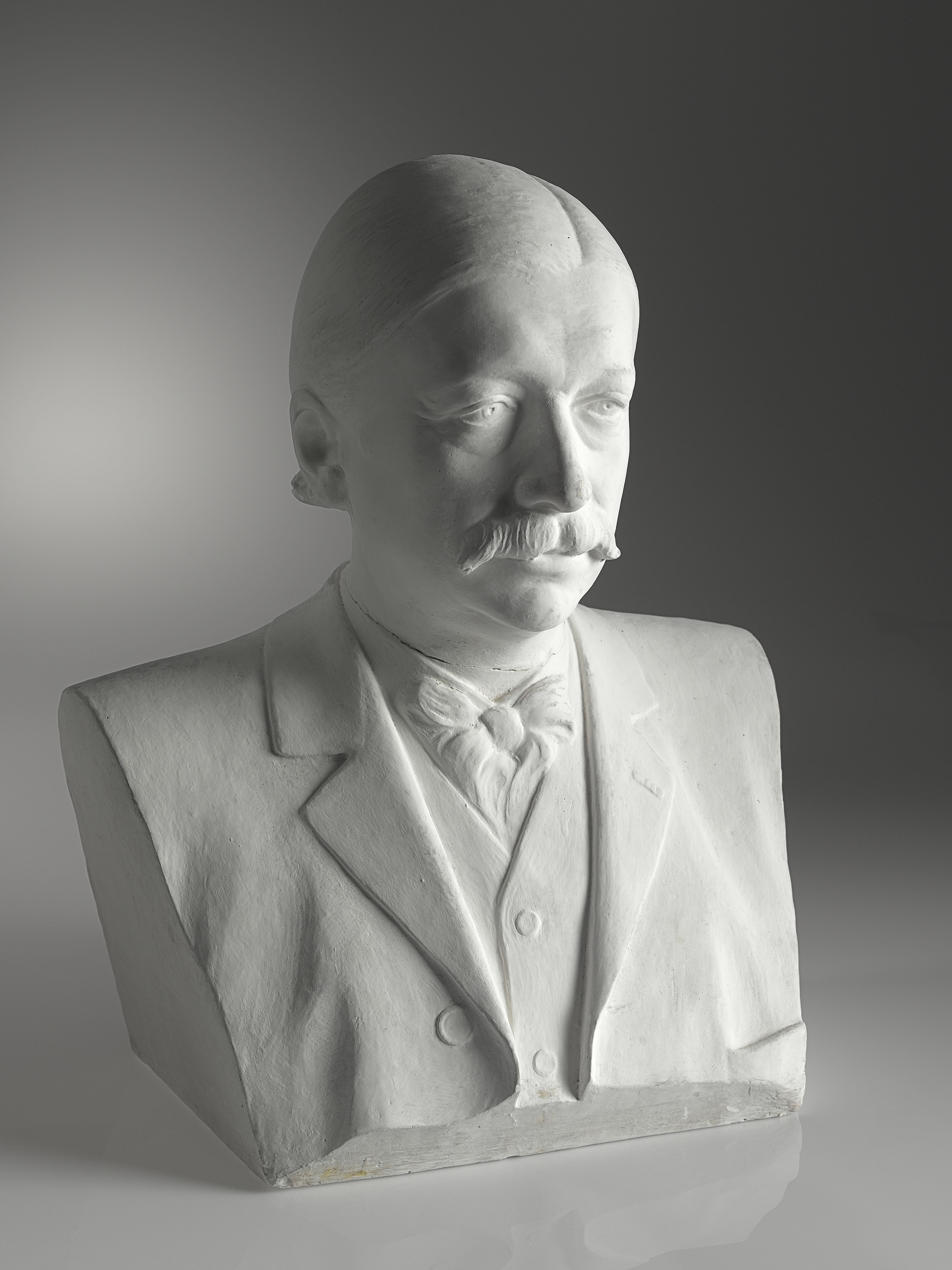
