= Carel Weeber =

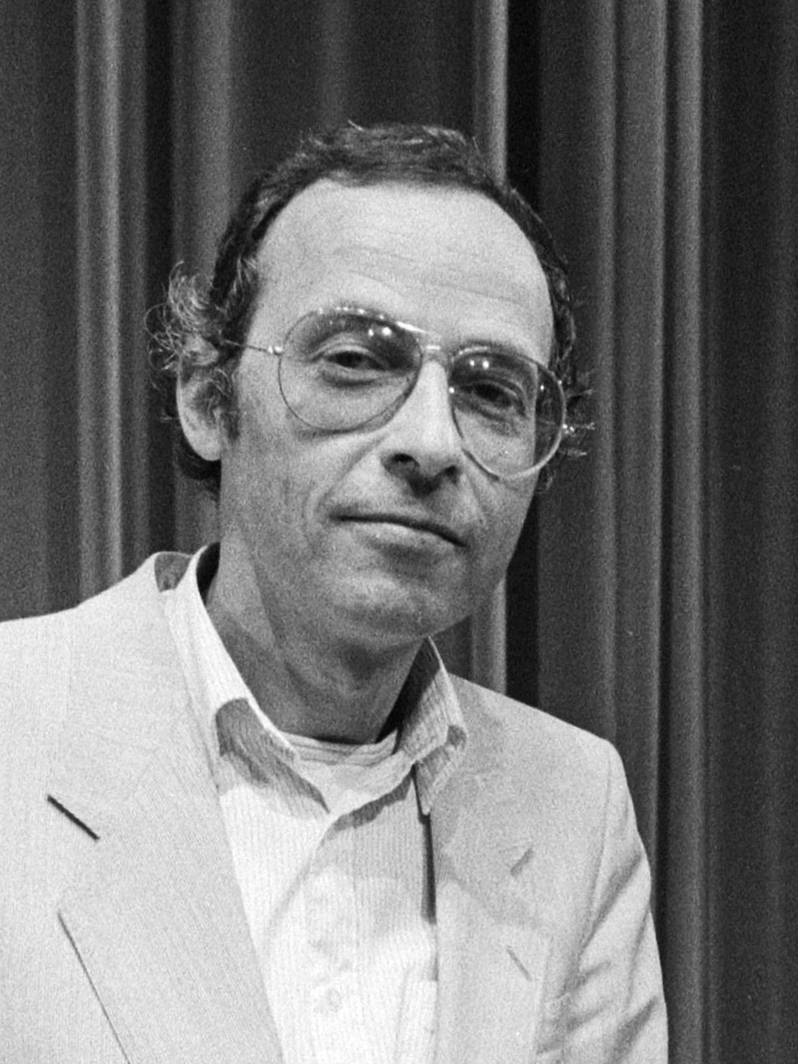
- Carel Weeber (1983)
- Born: December 3, 1937; Nijmegen, Netherlands
- Died: February 2, 2025 (aged 87); Leuven, Belgium
- Occupation: Architect
- Awards: Rotterdam-Maaskantprijs
- Buildings: De Zwarte Madonna, De Peperklip

Carlos José Maria (Carel) Weeber (born Nijmegen, 3 December 1937 – died Leuven, 2 February 2025) was a Curaçaoan–Dutch architect.

== Life and work ==
In his infancy, Weeber’s family moved to Curaçao. In 1955 he returned to the Netherlands by boat. He studied Architecture at the Delft University of Technology. In 1966, shortly after completing his studies, he won the Prix de Rome for Architecture with a design for a new Central Station in Amsterdam. One of his first works was a holiday home built in 1969 in Veere for a family member.

From 1970 to 2003, Weeber served as a professor at the Faculty of Architecture of the Delft University of Technology while also practicing as an architect. For a period he worked under his own name. For the Dutch pavilion at the Expo '70 in Osaka, he collaborated with Jaap Bakema Bakema of the firm Van den Broek and Bakema. Shortly thereafter, he contributed to the residential plan *Blijenhoek* on the outskirts of the center of Dordrecht.

In 1977, he joined the architectural firm of Jan Hoogstad and colleagues. In 1988, he left that firm and co‑founded de Architekten Cie. with Jan Dirk Peereboom Voller, Pi de Bruijn, and Frits van Dongen.

Weeber became known as a fierce opponent of what was termed the Nieuwe truttigheid "New Cutesy‑ness" in Dutch architecture—the small‑scale residential construction of the late 1970s, characterized by woonerf designs. In reaction, he designed several colossal buildings. In the late 1970s, he designed a hospital for North Vietnam that was entirely prefabricated in the Netherlands, shipped to North Vietnam, and assembled on site. Later, two more hospitals were built in Guinea-Bissau and Tanzania. From 1993 to 1998, he served as chairman of the Bond van Nederlandse Architecten (BNA). In a 1997 survey by de Volkskrant, his fellow architects even voted him the "worst architect" in the Netherlands. Earlier that year, in an interview with Bernhard Hulsman, editor of NRC Handelsblad, he introduced the term "Het Wilde Wonen" ("Wild Living") as a protest against rigid Dutch residential construction; a milder version of this approach later became known as "Gewild Wonen".

From 2003 onward, Weeber described himself as an ex‑architect. Fifty years after his arrival in the Netherlands, he returned to Curaçao in 2005, where he had designed a house for himself. He was knighted in the Order of the Dutch Lion and, in 2006, received the Rotterdam-Maaskantprijs.

Weeber died in February 2025 at the age of 87 after suffering from Alzheimer's disease.

== Family ==
Weeber was the son of Mr. Leon Antonio Luis Weeber (1910–1989), president of the Court of Justice of the Dutch Antilles, and Eleonora Heijnen (1910–1994). Between 1970 and 2003, he was married to Christina barones Collot d'Escury, daughter of an ambassador and a member of the Collot d'Escury family.

== Notable buildings ==
- Dutch Pavilion, Expo '70, Osaka (with J.B. Bakema)
- Pompenburg in Rotterdam (1977–1981)
- The Zwarte Madonna in The Hague, demolished in 2007
- Student residence de Struyck (1996) at the Rijswijkseplein in The Hague
- De Peperklip in Rotterdam-Zuid, which earned him the Betonprijs
- Metro stations in Spijkenisse, which earned him the Nationale Staalprijs in 1986
- Penitentiaire Inrichting Rotterdam (De Schie) in Rotterdam
- A complex on Dostojevskisingel in Venserpolder, Southeast Amsterdam (1982)

== Notable neighborhoods ==
- Thamerdal IV, Uithoorn (1997)
- Venserpolder, Southeast Amsterdam (1981–2005)

== Gallery ==
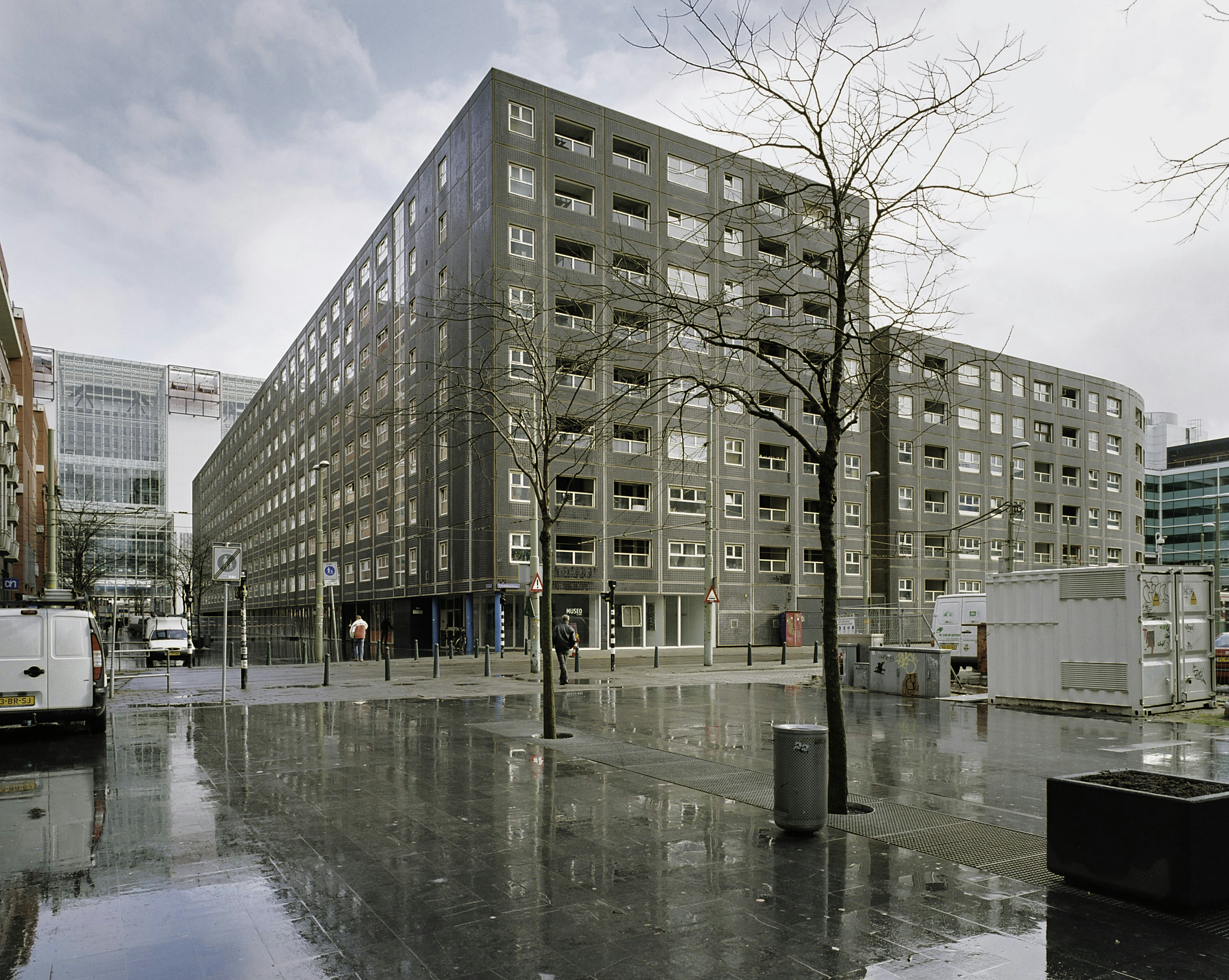
The Zwarte Madonna in The Hague

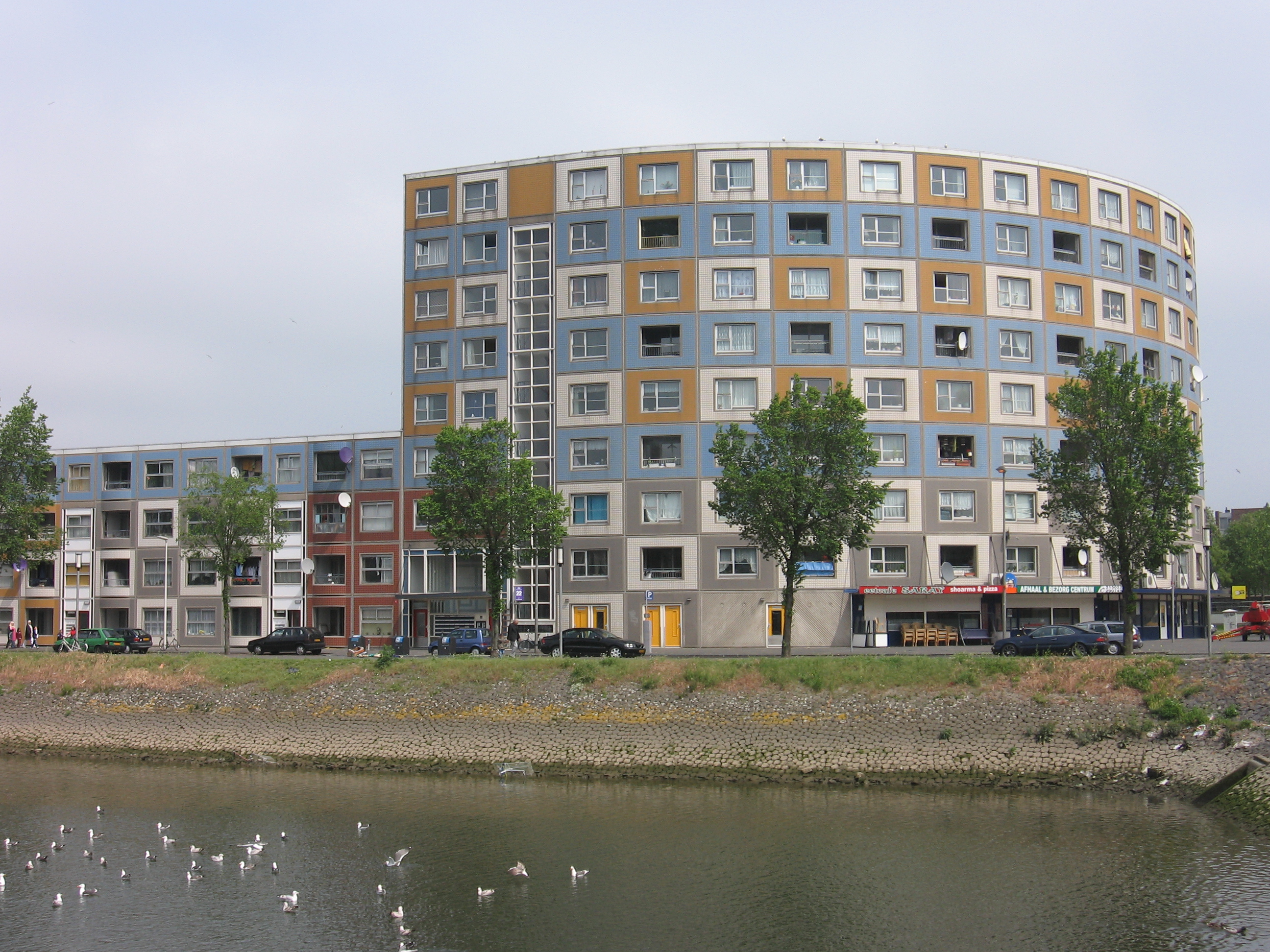
De Peperklip in Rotterdam

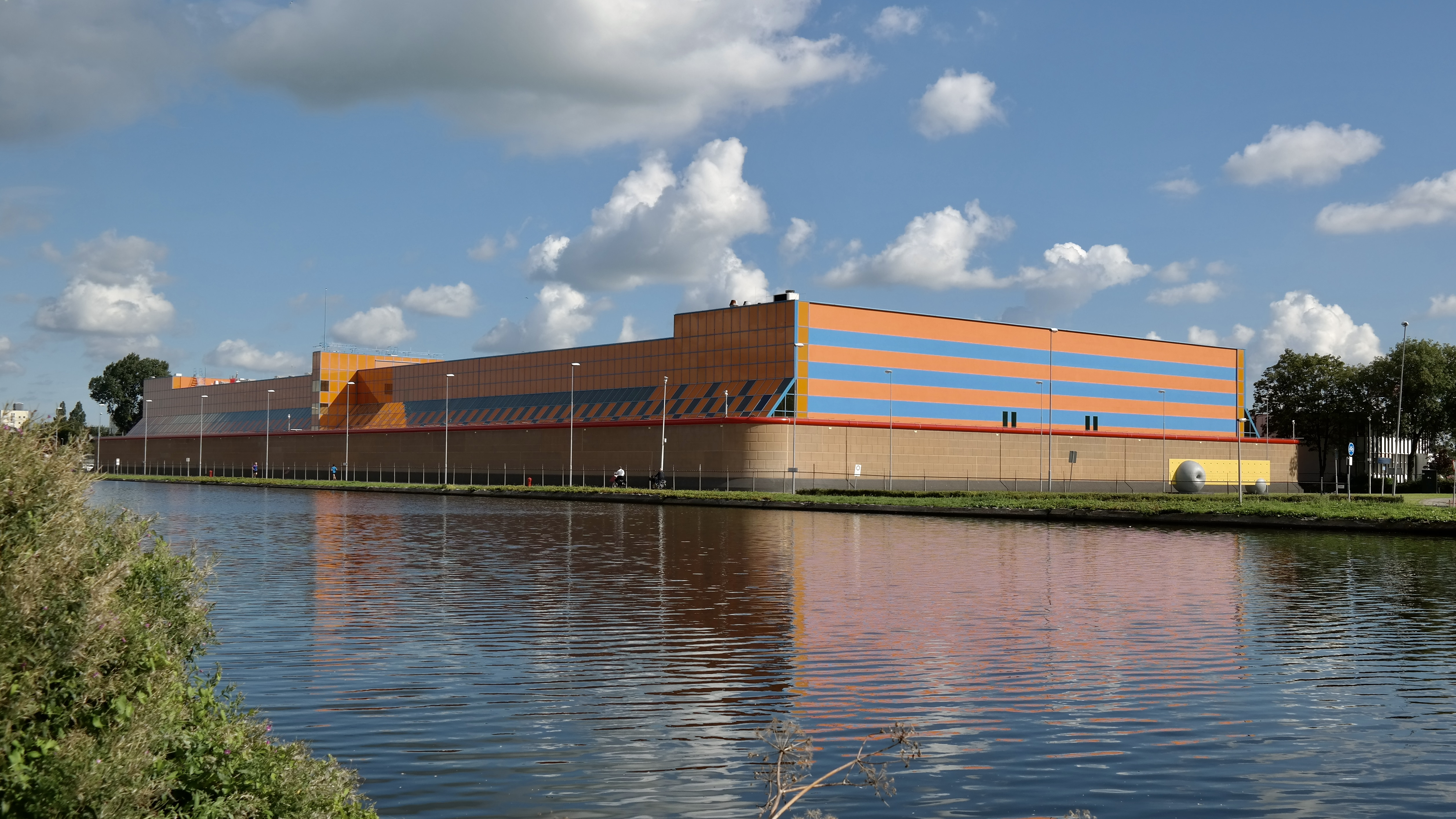
Penitentiary De Schie in Rotterdam

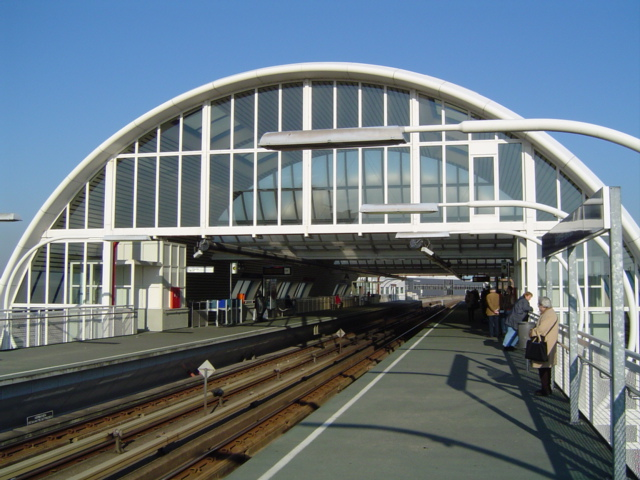
Metro Station Spijkenisse

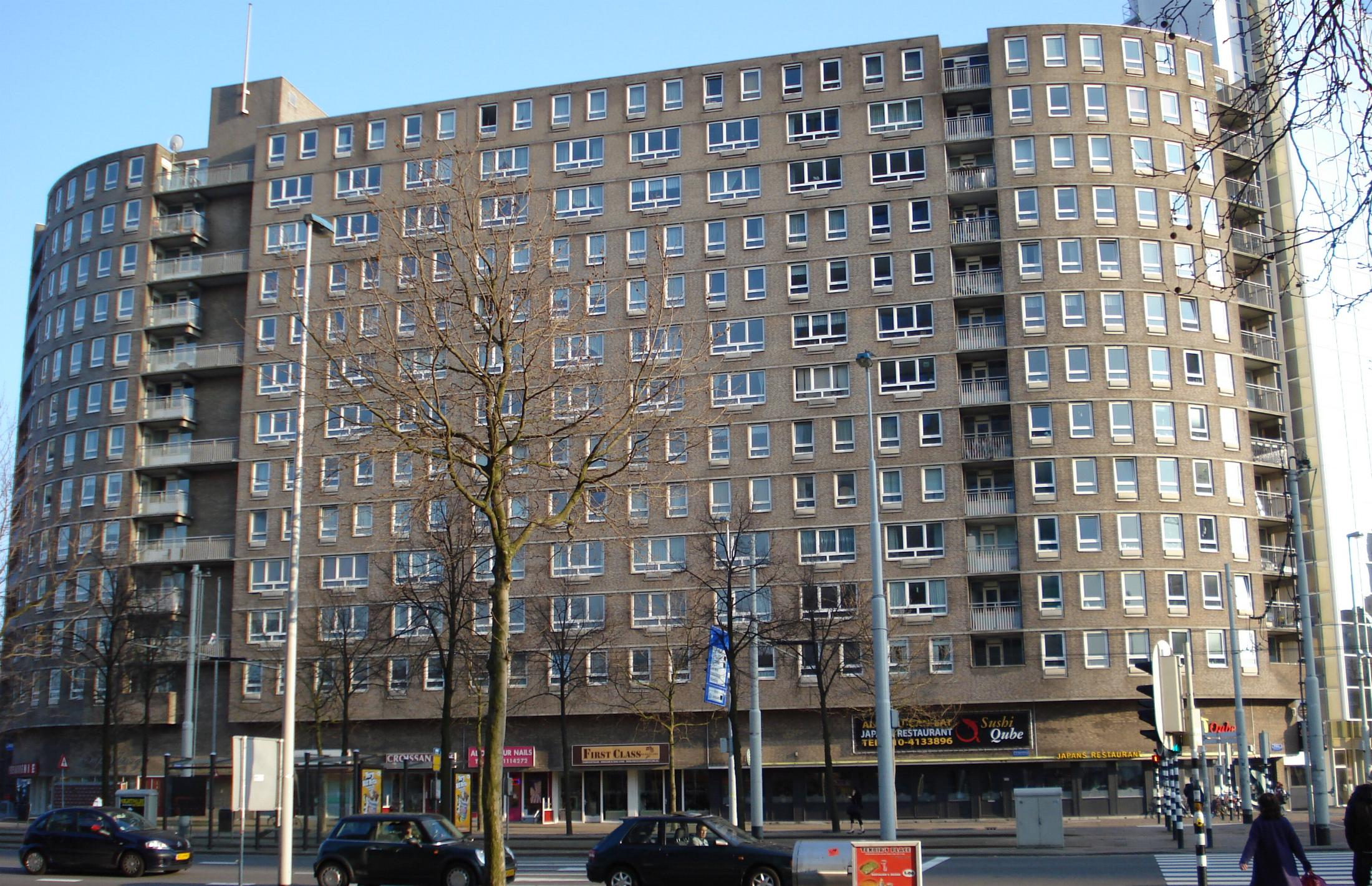
De Pompenburg in Rotterdam

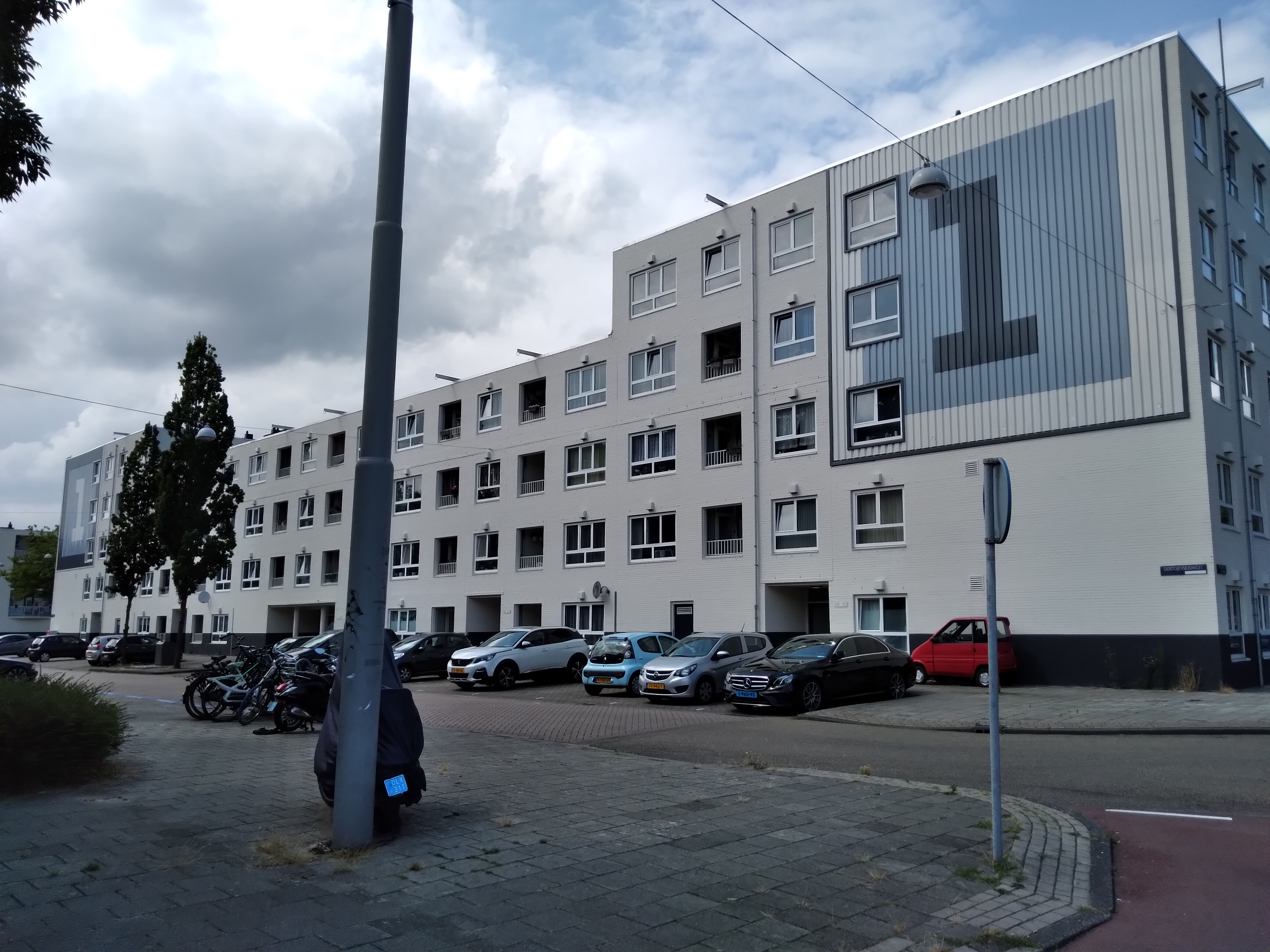
Complex on Dostojevskisingel, Venserpolder (August 2021)

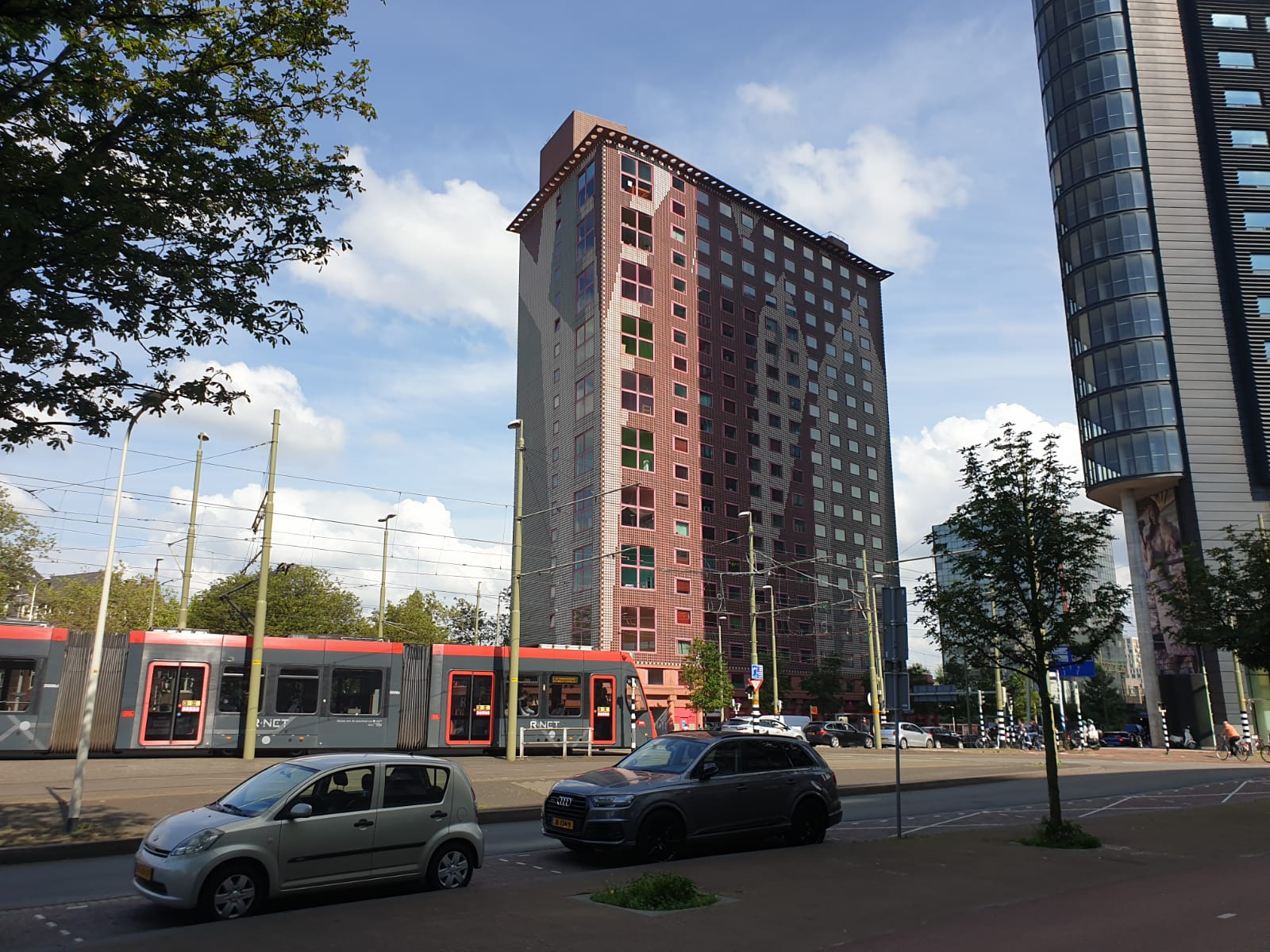
Student complex De Struyck in The Hague

== See also ==
- List of Dutch architects
