= Gerrit Bolhuis =

Dutch sculptor

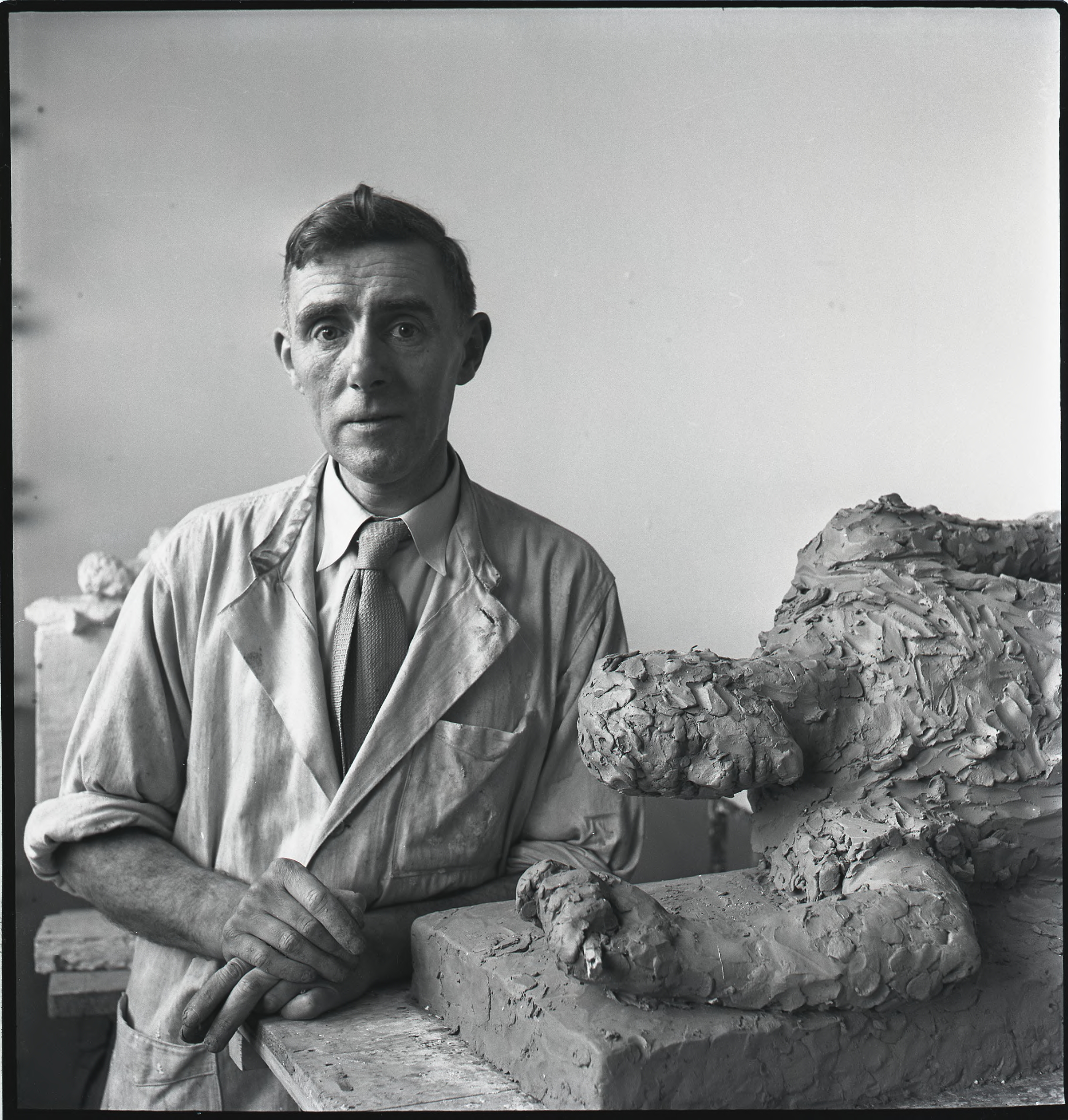
Gerrit Bolhuis (photo by Emmy Andriesse)

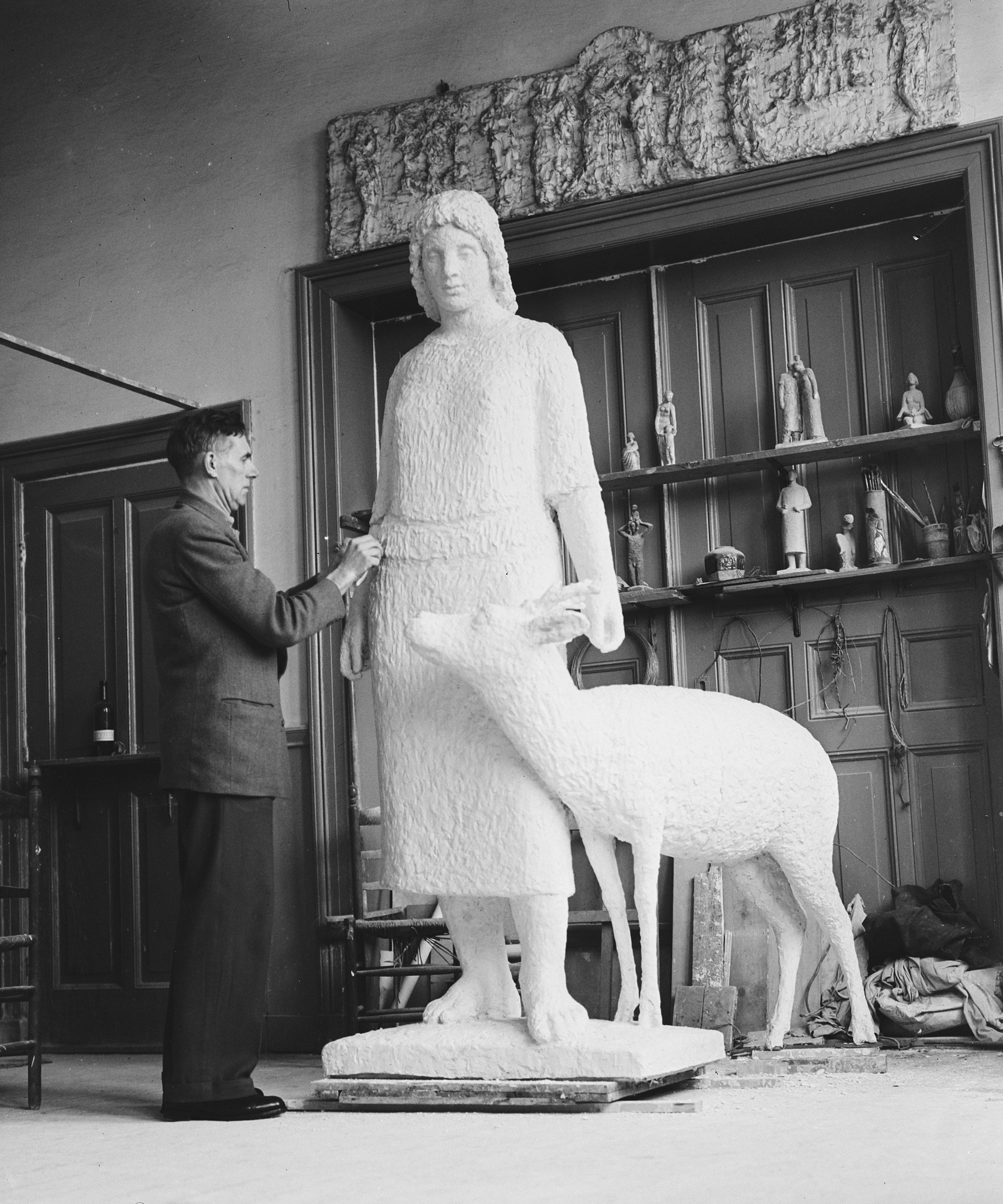
Gerrit Bolhuis

Gerrit Bolhuis (Amsterdam, Netherlands, 23 June 1907 - Amsterdam, 19 November 1975) was a Dutch sculptor.

== Biography ==
Bolhuis was born in 1907 in Amsterdam. He studied at the Kunstnijverheidsschool Quellinus under the teachers Jan Bronner and Hendrik Adriaan van de Wal. He was the winner of the Dutch Prix de Rome in 1934. After a troublesome time joining, he was accepted at the Dutch Society of Sculptors. Many of his works were created after World War 2, due to his work being disrupted then. He died in 1975 and is buried in Amsterdam. He is considered popular in the Netherlands but unknown to the general public.

== Notable works ==
A popular work of his is a series of lamb statues near a fountain in the district of Osdorpplein, Amsterdam, made in 1966. In 1959, he made a statue of William the Orange that was previously on display in Willemsted, Curacao, before being moved to Breda.
