= Galerie Maria Wettergren =

Contemporary art and design gallery in Paris, France

Coordinates: 48.8612°N 2.3628°E

Galerie Maria Wettergren is a contemporary art and design gallery in Paris, France, founded and directed by Maria Wettergren.

The gallery represents a selection of contemporary artists and designers working with different media. Interdisciplinary dialogues between art, design, architecture and crafts are central to the artistic direction of the gallery, with a strong focus on textile arts by women artists, art-design and kinetic photography. The gallery organizes monographic exhibitions, edits catalogues and is responsible for numerous museum collaborations and sales, including sales to the permanent collections of the Centre Pompidou, Paris; Smithsonian Cooper Hewitt Museum, New York; National Gallery of Victoria, Melbourne; Malmö Art Museum, Malmö; Museum of Contemporary Design and Applied Arts (mudac), Lausanne; and The Musée des Arts Décoratifs, Paris, among others.

Galerie Maria Wettergren regularly participates in international art fairs such as The European Fine Art Fair (TEFAF) in New York & Maastricht; the Foire Internationale d'Art Contemporain (FIAC 'Hors les Murs'); Design Miami/Basel; and PAD Paris/London.

The gallery is a member of the Comité Professionnel des Galeries d'Art.

== History ==
Galerie Maria Wettergren was founded by Maria Wettergren in 2010 in the Saint-Germain-des-Prés district of Paris, on rue Guénégaud. In 2020, the gallery moved to a bigger space located at 121 rue Vieille-du-Temple in the Marais district.

Maria Wettergren received the Finn Juhl Prize in 2014. She was a member of the Audi Award 2014 Jury together with Daniel Buren, Jean de Loisy and Emmanuel Perrotin. Maria Wettergren was included in the American Magazine Art + Auction’s Power 100 of the 100 most important personalities of the art world (December 2013).

== Artists ==
The gallery represents the artists and designers: Akiko Kuwahata & Ken Winther, Astrid Krogh, Benandsebastian, Benoît Fougeirol, Camilla Moberg, Carl Emil Jacobsen, Cecilie Bendixen, Ditte Hammerstrøm, Eske Rex, Étienne Bertrand Weill, Germans Ermičs, Gjertrud Hals, Grethe Sørensen, Hanne Friis, Ilkka Suppanen, Jakob Jørgensen, Katriina Nuutinen, Iskos Berlin/Boris Berlin, Line Depping, Lotte Westphael, Louise Campbell, Margrethe Odgaard, Mathias Bengtsson, Mikko Paakkanen, Niels Hvass, Rasmus Fenhann, Rodolphe Proverbio, Signe Emdal, Stine & Enrico Gamfratesi, Studio Brieditis & Evans, Tora Urup.
