= Jakob Jørgensen =

Danish furniture designer

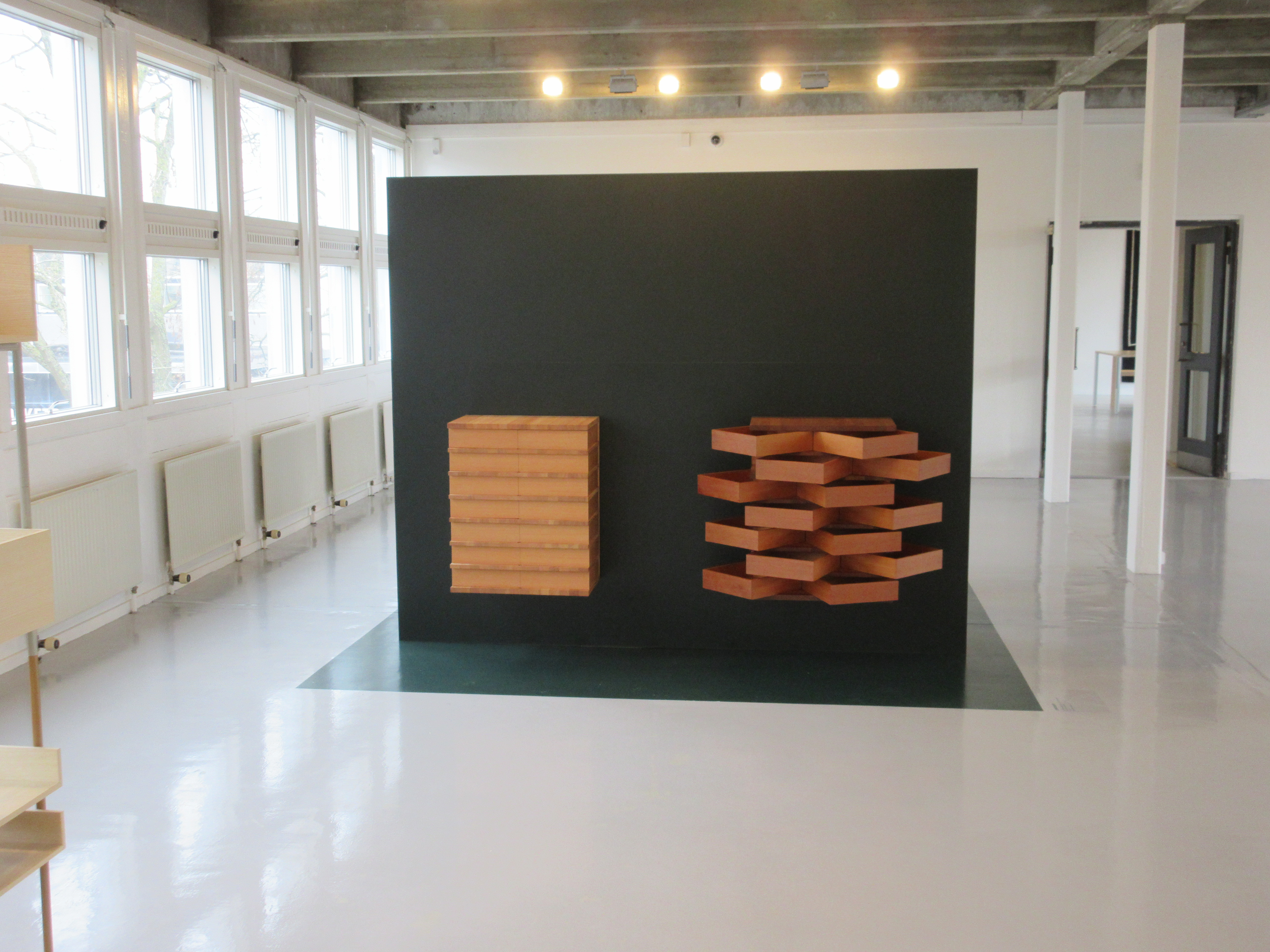
Jørgensen's Fjarill with open and closed drawers at A. Petersen's exhibition space in Copenhagen in 2018

Jakob Jørgensen is a Danish furniture designer who mainly works in wood. He collaborates with Line Depping under the name Depping & Jørgensen. He graduated from Danmarks Designskole in 2007.

== Selected works ==
- Barca, Condehouse
- Fjarill, Galerie Maria Wettergren
- Poets BookBook Hanger, mindcraft12
- Cloth Box, Galerie Maria Wettergren
- Tray Table, SE11
- Reol, 'Skud på stammen
- Rools, mindcraft14
- IO
- Baum, Galerie Maria Wettergren
- ISAK, IFDA

== Exhibitions ==
Jørgensen has exhibited at Galerie Maria Wettergren in Paris and has been represented on the Cabinetmakers’ Autumn Exhibition since 2009. In February–May 2018, he is one of four designers featured at the exhibition Halstrøm, Odgaard, Depping, Jørgensen at A. Petersen's exhibition space Bygning A in Copenhagen.

== Awards ==
- Barca won 1st prize in the IFDA competition in 2008.
- 2011 Bodum Design Award (Depping & Jørgensen)
- 2012 Wallpaper* Design Award
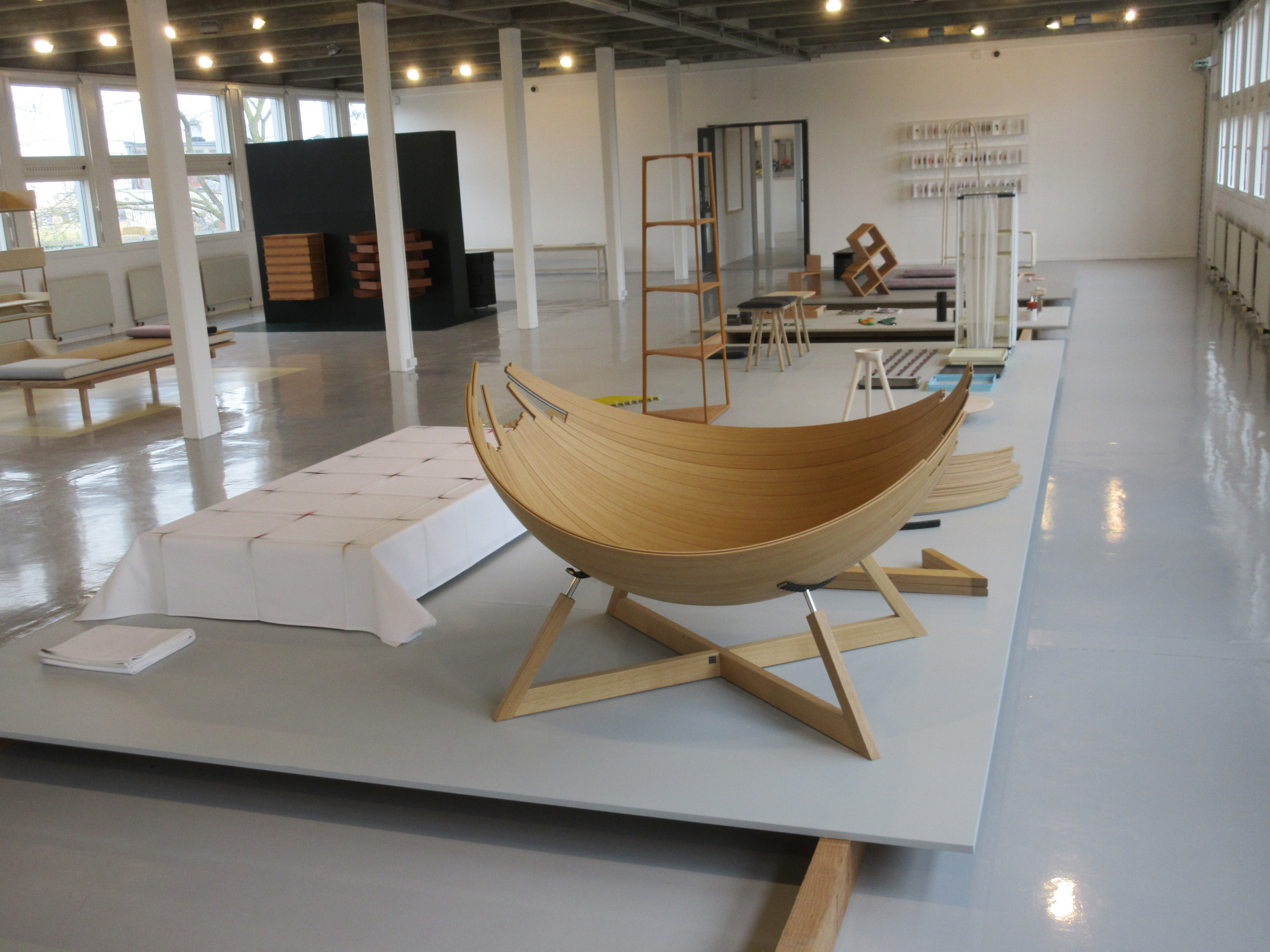
Barca

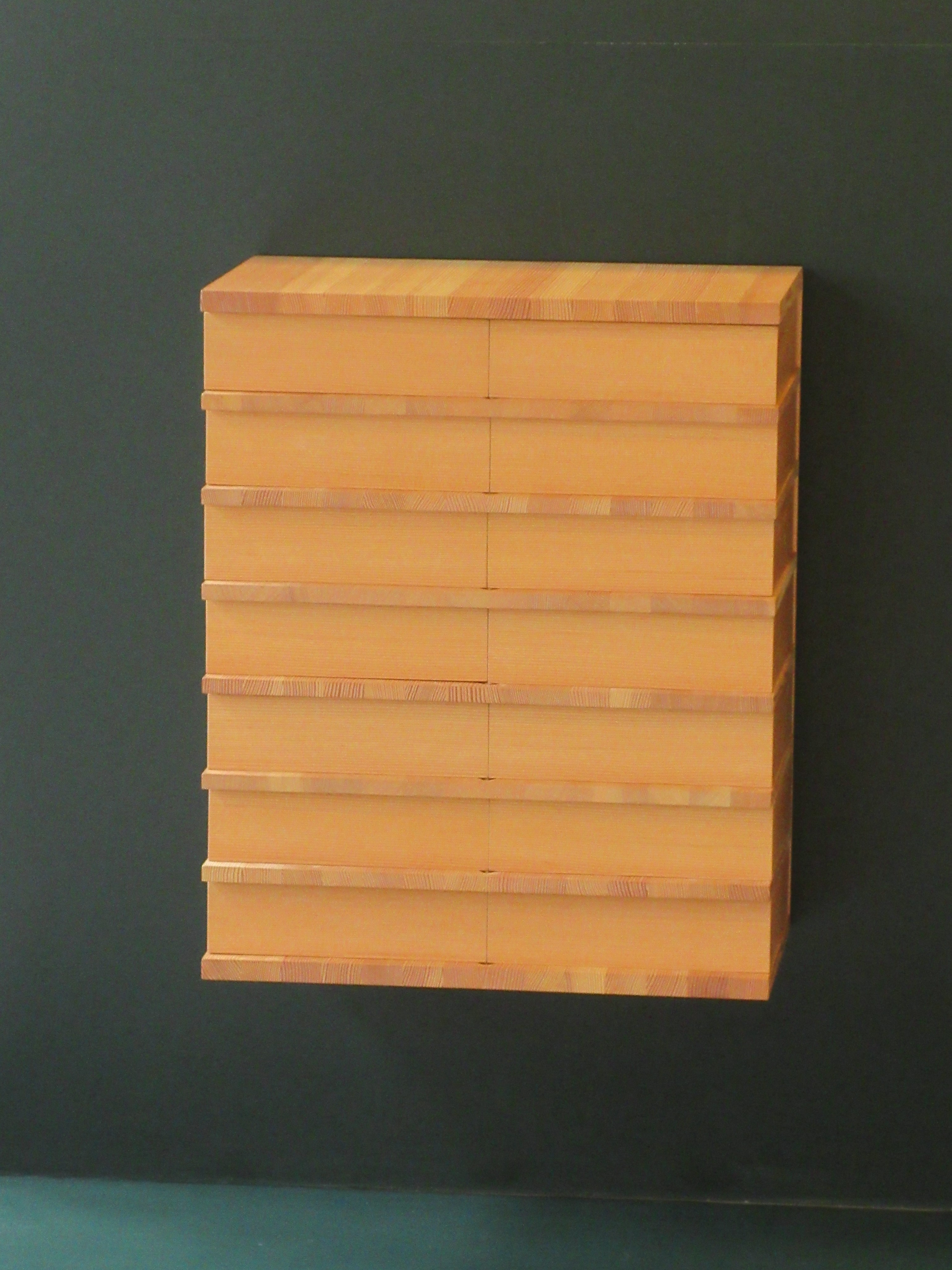
Fjarill with closed drawers

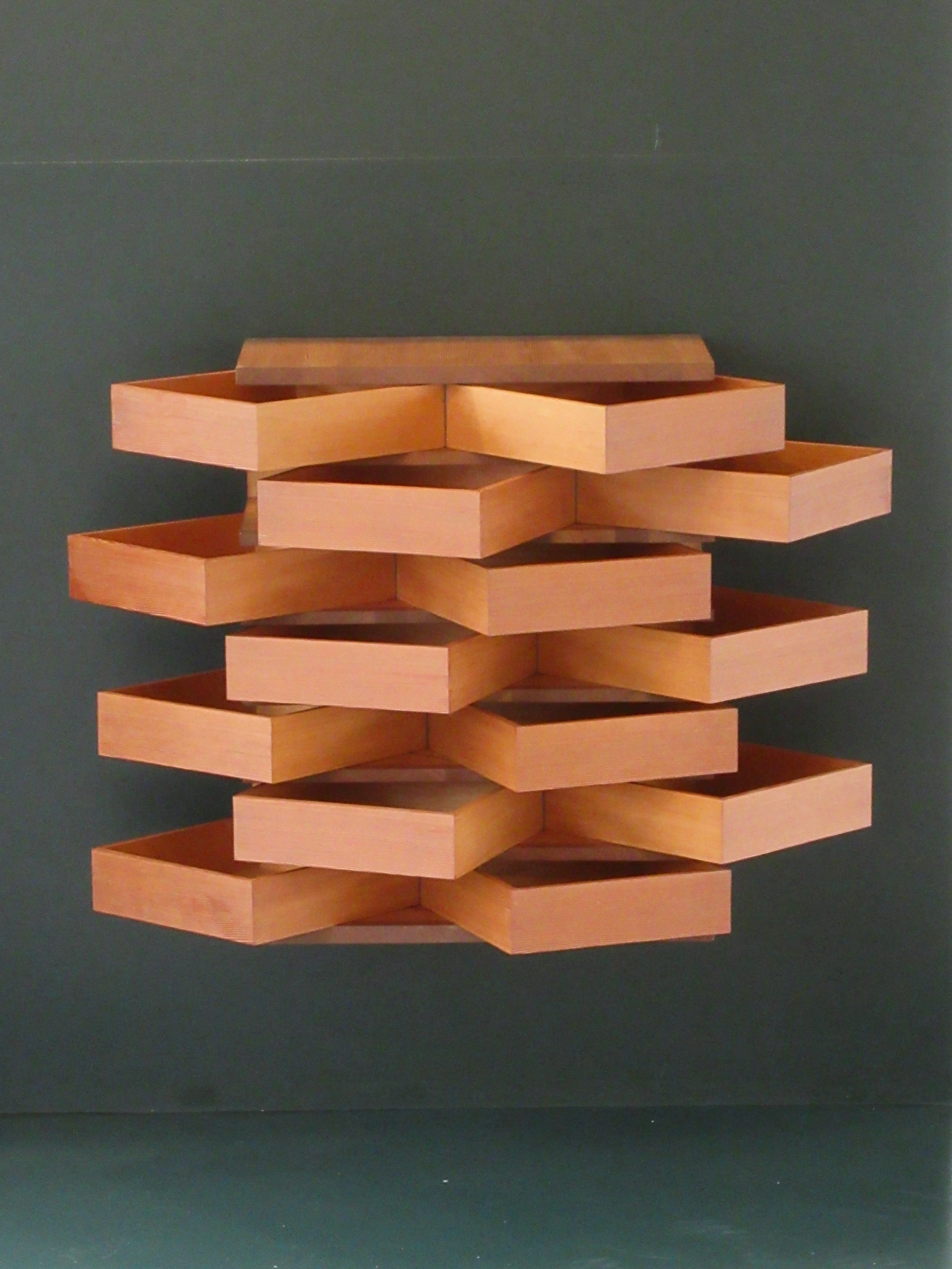
Fjarill with open drawers

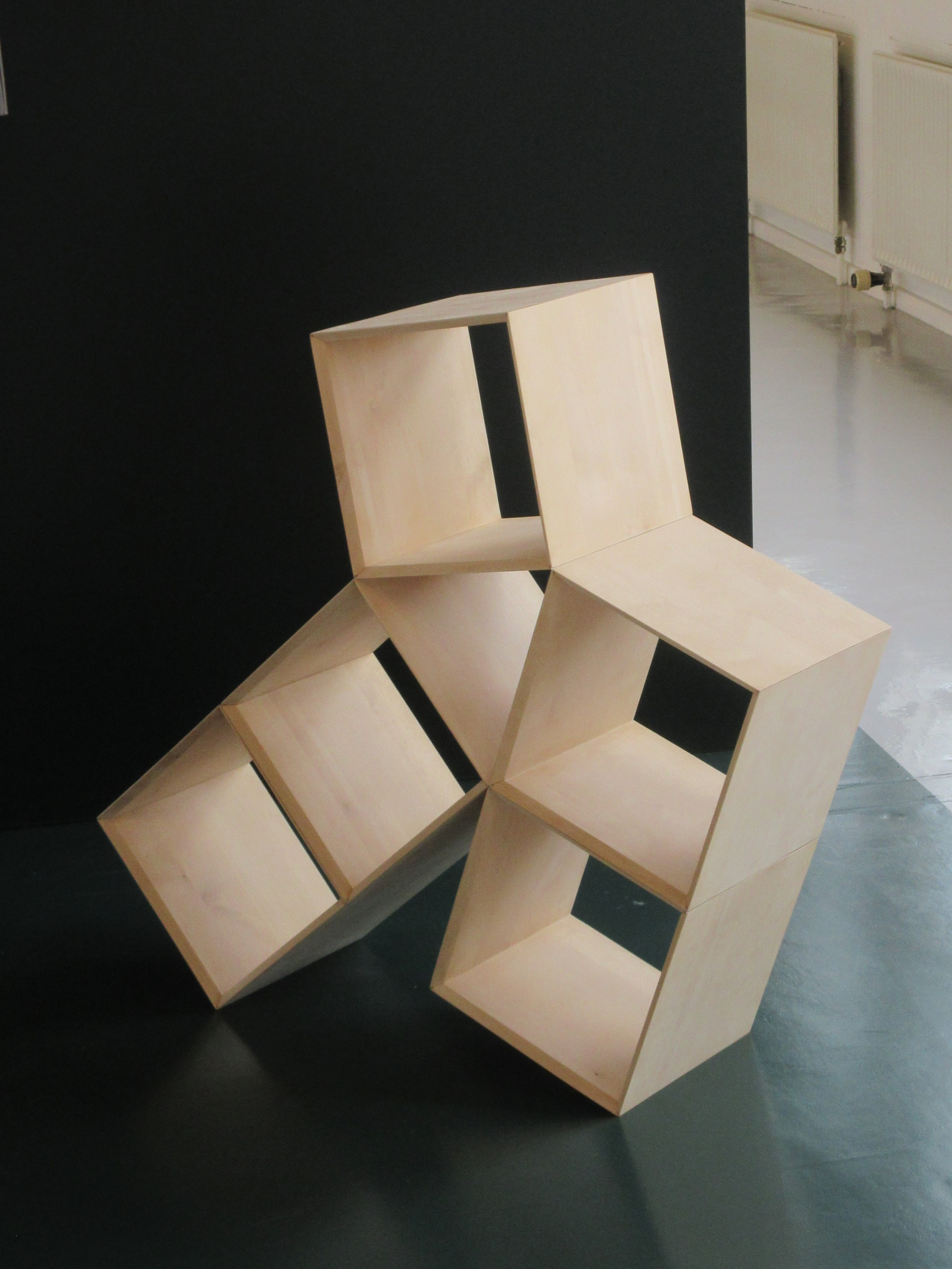
IO, modular shelving system
