= A. Petersen =

Arts and crafts centre in Copenhagen

Coordinates: 55°40′33″N 12°36′54″E

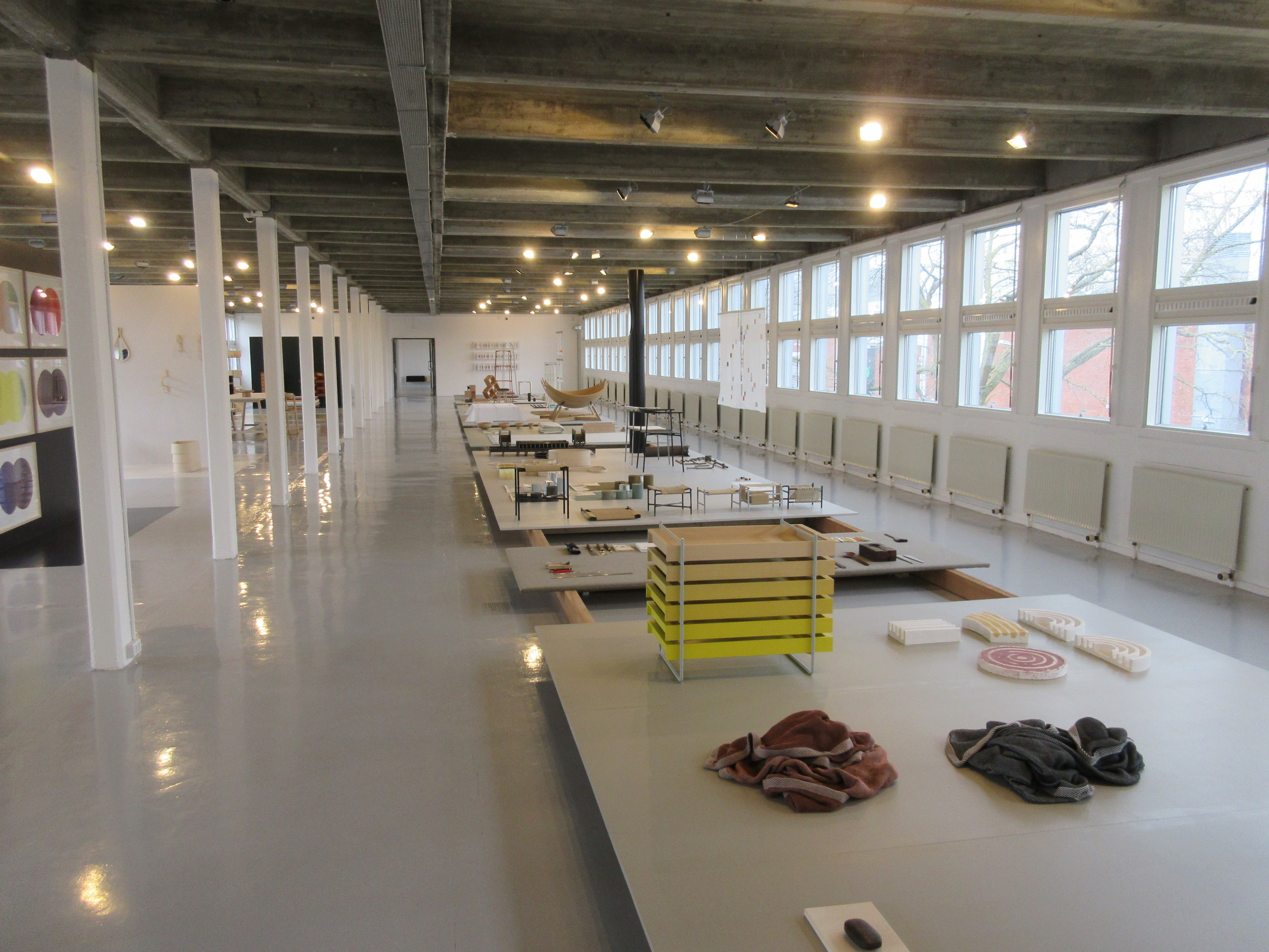
A. Petersen's exhibition space on the first floor

A. Petersen is an arts and crafts centre situated at Kløvermarksvej, on Amager, in Copenhagen, Denmark. The activities comprise a manufacturing workshop that facilitates collaboration between designers, architects and craftsmen, an exhibition space on the first floor and an arts and crafts store as well as presentations and other events.

== History ==
A. Petersen was established on 1 November 2014 by Anders Petersen. In May 2017, Politiken wrote that A. Petersen is "developing into the most important centres for contemporary arts and crafts in Copenhagen".

== Selected exhibitions ==
In 2018, A. Petersen hosted the exhibition Halstrøm, Odgaard, Depping, Jørgensen featuring works by the four designers Chris Liljenberg Halstrøm, Margrethe Odgaard, Line Depping and Jakob Jørgensen, who work both individually and in the constellations Halstrøm, Odgaard, Depping and Jørgensen.

== Image gallery ==
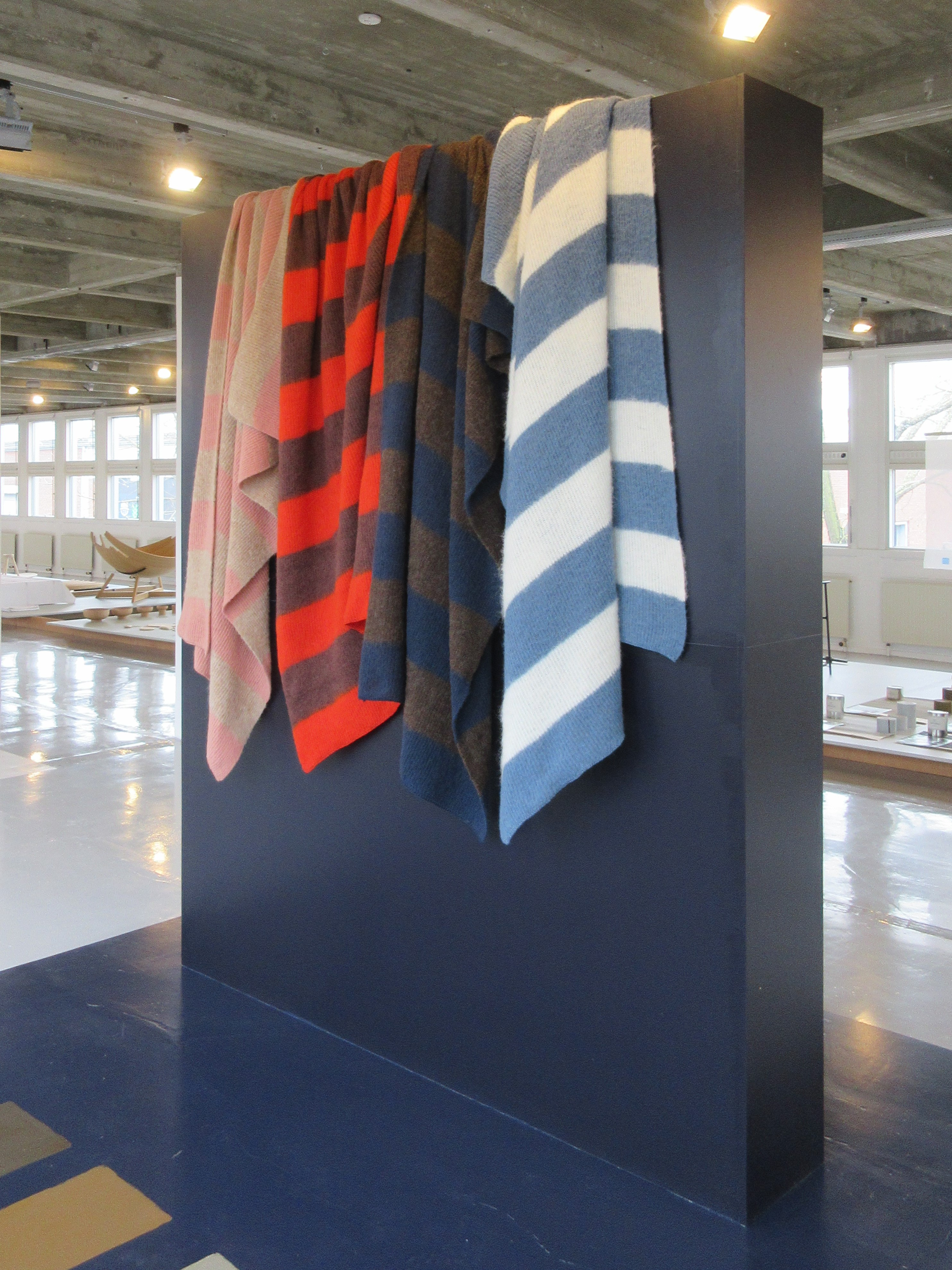
Woollen blankets designed by Margrethe Odgaard

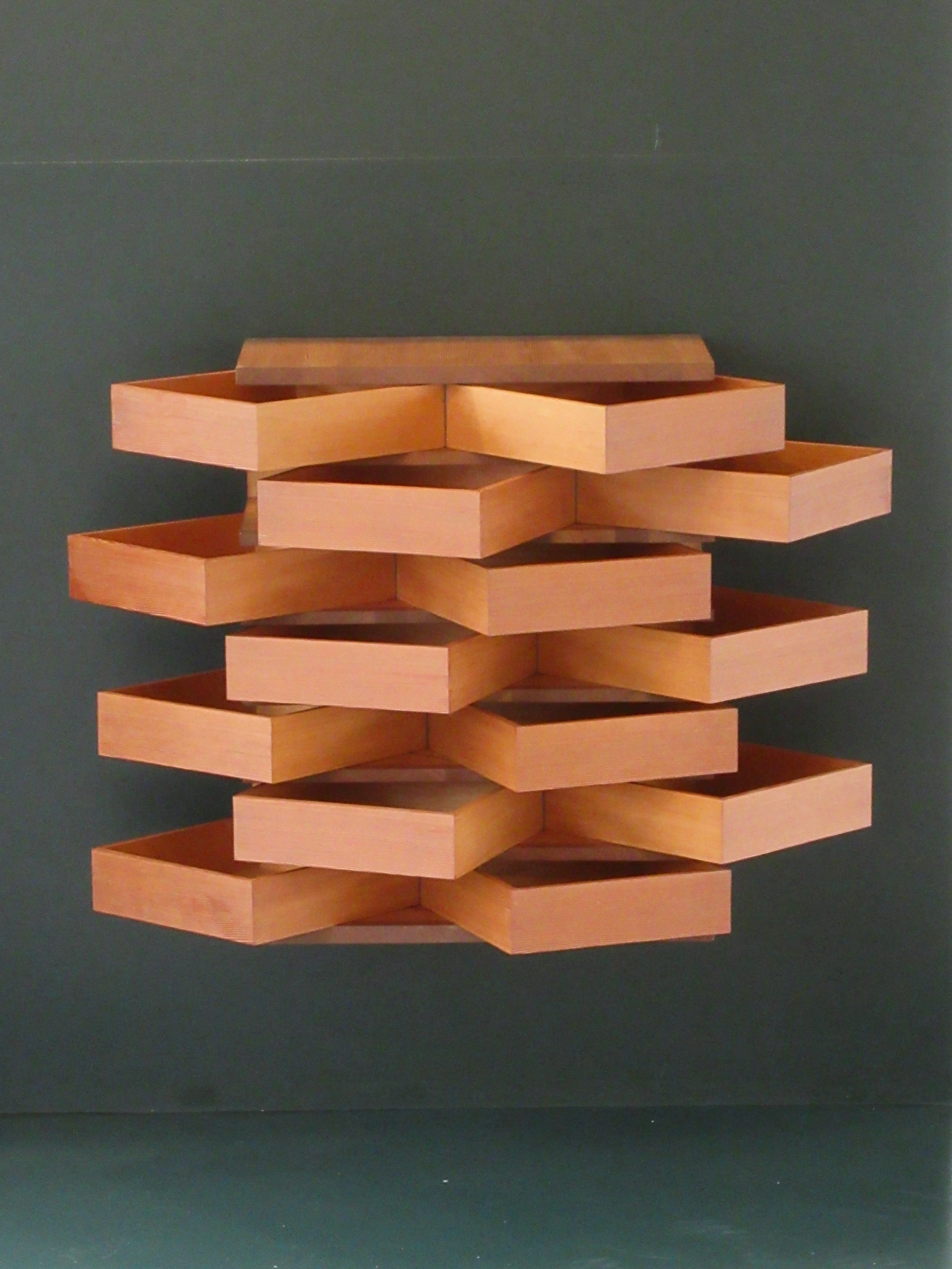
Jakob Jørgensen's Fjarrill
