= Étienne Bertrand Weill =

French photographer (1919 - 2001)

Etienne Bertrand Weill
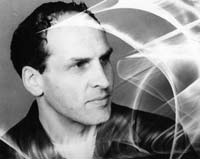
- Born: 16 November 1919; Paris XVI, France
- Died: 28 February 2001 (aged 81)
- Education: Ecole nationale supérieure Louis-Lumière
- Known for: Theatre, dance et abstract Photography
- Notable work: "Metaform" & kinetic suites - scenography with poem, dance & music
- Style: Abstract & Kinetic
- Spouse: Jacqueline Margulies
- Children: 5 daughters
- Website: www.ebweill.com/en/

Étienne Bertrand Weill (1919–2001) was a French photographer. His primary works were abstract Metaforms.

== Early life ==
Born in 1919 in Paris to an assimilated Jewish family, he is the son of Raphaël Weill and Jeanne Ullmann. He had an early interest in art, but decided to pursue photography because his older brother and two of his uncles, Louis Ullmann and Édouard Moyse (1827–1907), were already painters. He graduated from École nationale de Photographie et de cinéma Louis Lumière.

== War period ==
He joined the French Resistance in 1942, and used his drawing talents to forge identity papers in order to save children before enlisting in the maquis of the Éclaireurs israélites de France. At the end of the war he joined the First army to fight in the Vosges and Alsace campaign. His mother was arrested in 1942 before being interned at Drancy internment camp and later deported to Sobibor extermination camp where she was killed in March 1943.

== Early photographic career ==
After the conclusion of the war, he decided to pursue photography fulltime. His photographs during this period developed in various directions: he photographs architecture, art — becoming the main photographer of Jean Arp's works — and for a short period, experiments the humanist photography. These works are published in magazines — L'Architecture d'aujourd'hui, directed by André Bloc, or Cahiers d'Art by Christian Zervos. He portrays artists (Jean-Paul Sartre, Eugène Ionesco, etc.), documents the life of workers (The Life of a Parisian Metalworker, the Brass Band of Renault, The Demonstration...)

During the war, he had met with Marcel Marceau who represented a milestone in his career, orienting him towards mime, theatre and dance photography. He was the only photographer accepted by Étienne Decroux, and also took pictures of Jean-Louis Barrault and Madeleine Renaud.

== Metaforms, the mature work ==
From the 1960s, with the Metaforms created, he becomes one of the masters of abstract photography and takes his place in the kinetic art, one of the great trends of modern photography. He presents one of these early Metaforms in an exhibition organised by the Groupe Espace at Biot in 1957.

With these Metaforms, described as "music for the eyes" by Maurice Fleuret, he will later imagine and elaborate kinetic suites accompanied by music. Neither music or the Metaform are illustrative, but both aim at creating a world free from reality. They will be part of various scenographies, poetic recitals, concert, dance and mime shows, projected, among other places, at Le Musée d'art moderne de la Ville de Paris. in 1971 and 1976, Le theatre de la Ville de Paris (where in 1971 one of his suites is the prelude to Hymnen, by Karlheinz Stockhausen, choreographed by Le Ballet contemporain, in a scenography by Gérard Fromanger), and also projected at Opéra de Paris and in many international festivals around the world.

He also directed an experimental short film, produced by Office de Radiodiffusion Télévision Française, Variations I & I. It was awarded a special mention at the Jerusalem's Amateur and Short Film Festival.

From 1975 to 1986, he taught photography at Paris-Sorbonne University and was a member of the Plastic Arts Agregation jury.

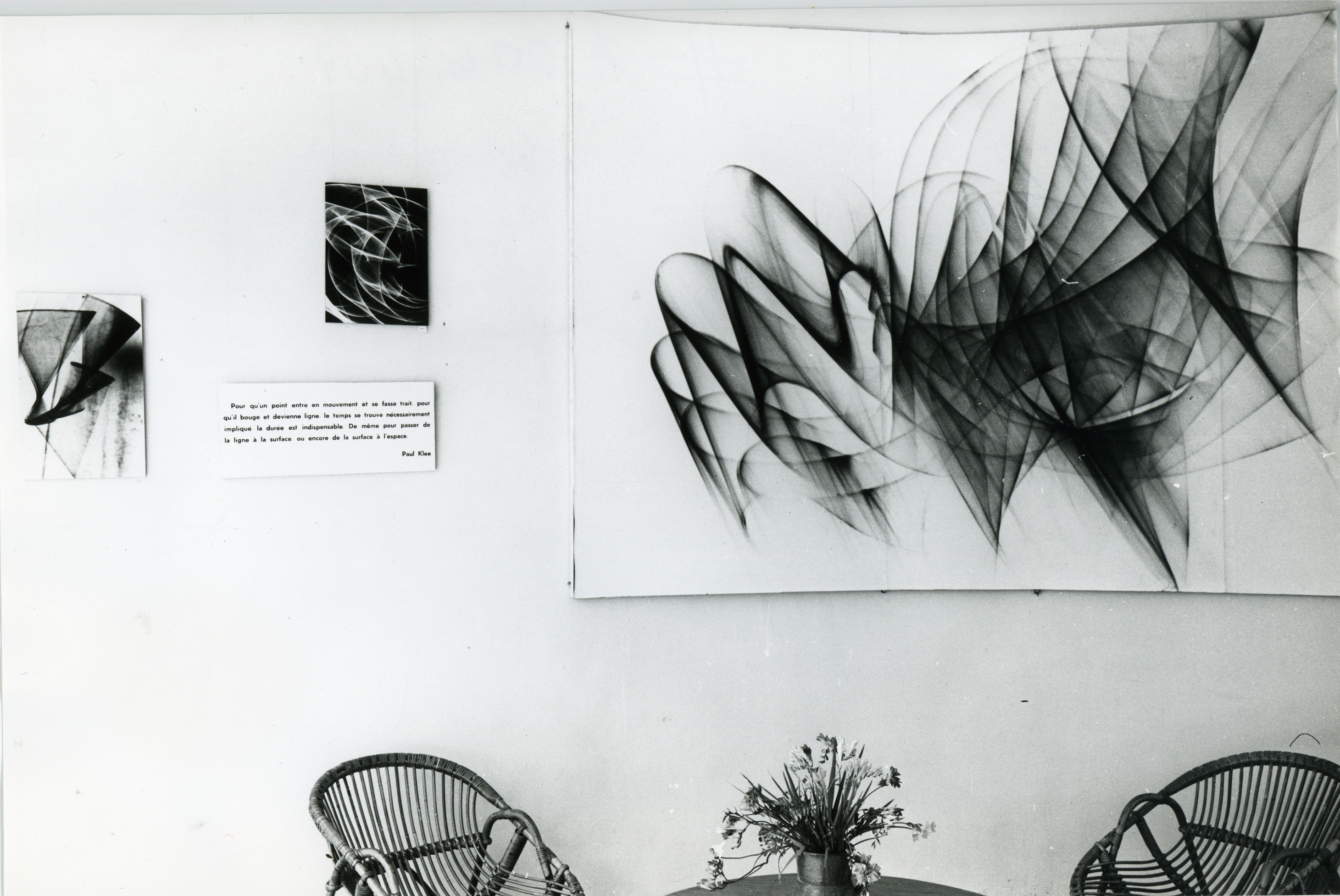
Etienne Bertrand Weill Exhibition of Metaforms in Maison des Beaux Arts Paris 1962

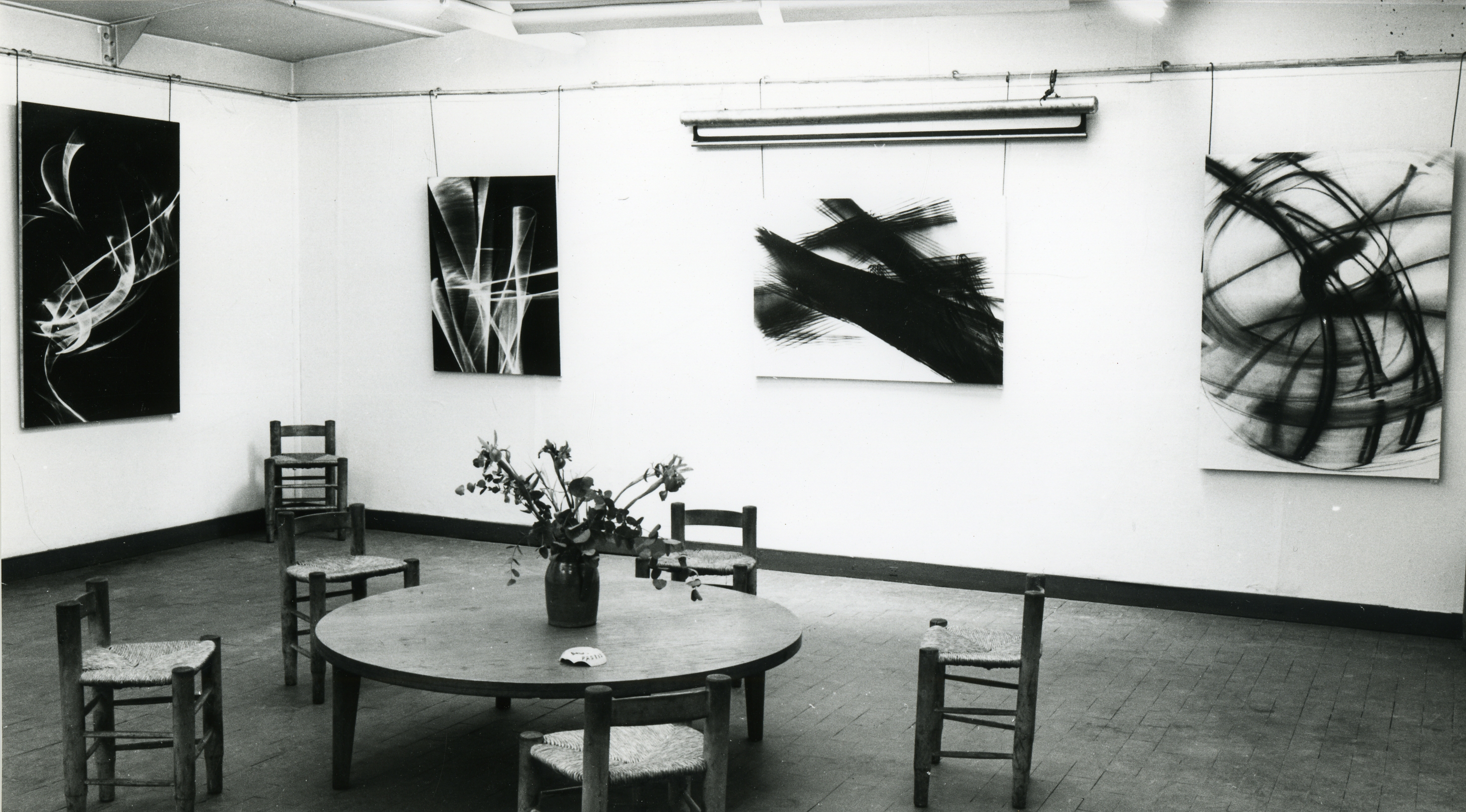

== Personal life ==
In 1948, Etienne Bertrand Weill marries Jacqueline Weill and five daughters will be born. From 1987 onwards, the couple lived in Jerusalem, where he continued to work until his death in 2001.

== Main posthumous exhibitions ==
- 2002 Hommage to Etienne Bertrand Weill, Suzanne Dellal center, Tel-Aviv, Israél
- 2005 Centre Culturel de la Visitation, Festival Mimos Exhibition Etienne Decroux, photographies by Étienne Bertrand Weill, Périgueux
- 2005 "L'œil moteur", art optique & cinétique, Musée d'Art Moderne et Contemporain (MAMCS) Strasbourg, France
- 2008 Acteurs en scène, Bibliothèque nationale de France, Paris
- 2008 "Etienne Bertrand Weill 1919-2001 - Lumières et Mouvements", Galerie Hautefeuille, Paris
- 2012 Vertige du corp, BnF François-Mitterrand (The National Library of France), Paris
- 2014 Galerie Maria Wettergren, Paris
- 2015 La photographie française du xx century Pordenone, Italy
- 2016 Galerie Maria Wettergren, "Trajets de Lumière", Paris
- 2017 "Le Pouvoir du geste" Hommage to the mime Marcel Marceau
- 2019 "Vers d'autre rives", Galerie Maria Wettergren, Paris
- 2021 Noir & Blanc at Grand Palais,Paris
- 2022 "Un coup de peigne astral", Galerie Maria Wettergren, Paris

== Main personal exhibitions ==
- 1956 Galerie d'Orsay, Paris Le monde du théâtre
- 1957 First exhibition of a metaform with Le Groupe Espace
- 1957 Librairie Al ferro di Cavallo, Rome, Italy
- 1957 Centre Français d'Etudes et d'Information, Milan, Italy
- 1957 Galerie Lilienhof, Fribourg en Brisgau
- 1962 Maison des Beaux Arts, Paris: Métaformes,
- 1962 Université de Sarrebruck, Germany
- 1964 French Institute Köln, Germany
- 1964 Université de Sarrebruck, Germany
- 1964 Salon d'Art Sacré: Magnificat, France
- 1964 Alliance Française de Buenos-Ayres: Libre Expression
- 1964 Ambassade de France, Tel-Aviv, Israël
- 1966 Cloître de la Cathédrale de Vaison la Romaine, France
- 1968 Semaine culturelle de Bolbec, Lillebonne & N.D. de Gravenchon, France
- 1969 Palais de l'Europe, Menton, France
- 1971 Théâtre Récamier, Jean-Louis Barrault, Paris, France
- 1972 Holstebro-Museum, Danemark
- 1973 Galerie Knoll, Nîmes, France
- 1973 Festival de Collias, France
- 1975 Inaugurations du Nouveau Centre des Arts et Loisirs du Vésinet, France
- 1975 Ambassade de France, Tel-Aviv, Israël
- 1976 Galerie Saint Roch, France
- 1976 Aéroport d'Orly, France
- 1976 Galerie Lilienhof, Fribourg en Brisgau
- 1977 C.A.E.S.-C.N.R.S. Meudon-Bellevue, France
- 1978 Ambassade de France, New-York
- 1978 Musée Guimet, Paris, France
- 1978 Musée de Poitiers, France
- 1980 Musée des Beaux Arts, Besançon, France
- 1980-1982 Universités américaines de Georgie, de Murcie, du Kansas, de Pennsylvanie, de l'Etat de New-York.
- 1980-1982 Centres Culturels du Maine, de Caroline du Nord, de Californie et du Wisconsin.
- 1983 "Le mime Etienne Decroux et son École", Métaformes, Cinémathèque de Montréal.
- 1978 Théâtre de Winnipeg, Canada
- 1989 Théâtre de Chicago (mime & theatre)
- 1993 Festival du Movement Theatre International & Esther Klein Gallery, Philadelphia

== Main collective exhibitions ==
- 1946 to 1959 E.B. Weill participated in all "salons nationaux et internationaux du Cabinet des Estampes" (Bibliothèque Nationale) & in "the salons la Société Française de Photographie"
- 1949 IVth Salon National de la Photographie
- 1950 Vth Salon National de la Photographie,
- 1950 37th Salon International d'Art Photographique
- 1950 Société Française de Photographie
- 1951 39th Salon International d'Art Photographique
- 1951 Société Française de Photographie
- 1951 VIth Salon National de la Photographie
- 1953 VIIIth Salon National de la Photographie
- 1953 36th Salon des Artistes Décorateurs
- 1954 37th Salon des Artistes Décorateurs
- 1955 Xth Salon National de la photographie
- 1956 XIth Salon National de la Photographie
- 1957 Salon International de Bièvres
- 1958 Collective Exhibition with Groupe Espace, Biot.
- 1958 Librairie Galerie Eliane Norberg, Paris Masques & Photographies avec Thérèse Le Prat & Nina Vidrovitch
- 1959 IIIth Biennale Internationale du Centre National de la Photographie
- 1963 Laboratoire des Arts, participation à l'équipe dirigée par Jean-Louis Renucci,
- 1963 Premier prix de la Biennale de Paris
- 1965 Expressions photographiques 65
- 1965 Groupe Libre expression
- 1966 Salon d'Art Sacré
- 1966 Interpress-Photo 66, International Exhibition, Moscou
- 1966 Alliance Française de Buenos-Ayres, Libre Expression
- 1966 International exhibition of pictorial photography, Édimbourg
- 1967 Kinetic Art Exhibition, organised by Frank Popper at Musée d'Art Moderne de la Ville de Paris
- 1968 Third Festival de la Photographie, Besançon
- 1968 Cinétisme, Spectacle, environnement, Grenoble
- 1968 24 heures de l'image, Exhibition with "Gens d'images" Théâtre de l'Ouest Parisien, Boulogne
- 1969 Espace et Lumière, Exhibition by "la Société des Artistes Décorateurs", Grand Palais, Paris
- 1969 Salon des Artistes Décorateurs Le vent se lève
- 1970 Project of groupe Laboratoire des Arts group for the Pavillon Français in Osaka
- 1970 Européan Festival - l'image photographique, Pau octobre 70
- 1970 Le Dynamisme, Fist french salon franco-belge, Werwicq-sud
- 1971 Exhibition of scénographies with the Ballet Théâtre Contemporain, Grenoble, Angers, Rennes, Reims & 8 countries of south America
- 1971 IIth Salon FrancoBelge
- 1971-72 Itinérant Exhibition organised by Valentine Faugère at Nairobie (Kenya), Blantyre (Malawi), Dar es Salam (Tanzanie), Accra (Ghana), Cotonou (Bénin), Lomé (Togo), Tananarive (Madagascar)
- 1973 Xth Festival d'Art contemporain de Royan
- 1975 Espace et Lumière, Aspects of photographique research
- 1975 "Les peintres Musicalistes", Galery Hexagramme, Paris, itinérant Exhibition in Australia, Nouvelle Calédonie, Ile Maurice, Malawi, Dahomey
- 1975 Biennale du Noir et Blanc, La Garenne Colombes
- 1976 Biennale of Ibizza
- 1976 "Paris de rêves"
- 1976 Exhibition Nationales in Biot
- 1977 Festival de Théâtre Musical de Poitiers «L'espace et les Espaces"
- 1977 Festival Européen de l'image photographique, Pau du 17 au 25 octobre
- 1977 Inauguration du Centre Georges Pompidou
- 1979 Les photographes de l'Imaginaire", Palais de la Découverte, Paris
- 1979 Palazzo dell'Arte, Milano, Panorama della fotografia francese, Club des 30x40
- 1979 Paris Libre Expression V
- 1982 Une autre photographie", Maison des Arts, Créteil
- 1983 Salon des Photographes professionnels, Porte de Versailles
- 1984 La photographie créative, Pavillon des Arts au Forum des Halles
- 1985-87 Le Bougé, Edimbourg, Londres, Musée de Beaune, Australie
- 1987 Le temps d'un mouvement, Musée d'Art Moderne, Paris
- 1999 Exhibition Renaud Barrault in the Galerie de l'Hôtel de Ville
- 1999 Exhibition Poliéri

== Main concert shows ==
- 1964 Variations I & II', métaformes d'Etienne Bertrand Weill, music by Gilbert Amy, film 16 mm, produced by le Service de la Recherche de l'ORTF.
- 1964 Projection for Variations Centre Culturel in Royaumont & the French Institute Köln
- 1965 Théâtre du Vieux Colombier Paris, poétic evening by Bernard Mermod & new création of Bateau Ivre, Arthur Rimbaud poèm.
- 1965 French Institute Sarrebruck: Variation I & II & Bateau Ivre,
- 1965 Festival de Vaison la Romaine, projections for Sol de Compiègne', Robert Desnos poem.
- 1966 Fribourg en Brisgau University, Projections for "la Ballade de l'Etranger", mimodrame by Charles Bensoussan
- 1968 Centre International de Séjour, Paris, projections of Anaklasis, music by Penderecki
- 1969 Palais de l'Europe in Menton, création de la Fête des Belles Eaux, Projections with music by Olivier Messian, Adagio - Bela Bartok music
- 1969 "Théâtre de la Musique", Paris, collaboration with Jacques Noël, projections for "Bip dans la vie moderne et future" by Marcel Marceau
- 1970 Xth Festival International de l'Image, Epinal: Grand prix Leitz France pour Adagio
- 1970 Maison de la Culture de Grenoble: prélude with projections for Hymnen, music by Stockhausen danced by le Ballet Théâtre Contemporain
- 1971 Théâtre de la Ville, Paris, Hymnen, projections on a 40-meter screen this Performance was presented in many cultural centers in France & in South America
- 1971 Musical International weeks of Paris, new creation of Dorian Horizon, with Toru Taqkemitsu music
- 1971 Music for the Eyes, présented by Maurice Fleuret at l'ARC, Musée de la Ville de Paris
- 1972 Holstebro-Museum, Danemark: Music for the Eyes
- 1972 Graphexpo, Paris, Projections in an inflatable structure
- 1973 Festival de Collias: concert-spectacle with the Trio Deslogéres, Vision des Temps Immémoriaux, music by Antoine Tisné & d'un mouvement du Quatuor pour la Fin du Temps, music by Olivier Messian
- 1974 Rencontre Internationales d'Arles, concert-spectacle avec le Trio Deslogères, creation of Tarquinia, music by Charles Chaysnes
- 1974 Festival d'Amboise, création de Rondo Mobile, music by Marcel Goldmann, chorégraphie d'Alain Davesne
- 1974 Festival Estival de Paris: Music for the Eyes
- 1975 Théâtre des Champs Elysées projections for "Bip dans la Vie moderne et future", by Marcel Marceau
- 1976 Musée d'Art Moderne de la Ville de Paris: Nouvelle soirée Music for the Eyes, création of Rhétos, music by Hubert Stuppner & Chtaslivi, Music by Solange Ancona, dance Muriel Jaër
- 1977 concerts-spectacles with the Trio Deslogères in Israël: Tel-Aviv Museum & Jérusalem University
- 1977 Centre Culturel de Chatillon sous Bagneux: Nouvelle soirée Music for the Eyes, new création of Trio en Quatorze Variations, music by Beethoven
- 1977 Musée Guimet, in a concert with the ACIC, présentation of Chtaslivi & Dorian Horizon
- 1977 Centre Mandapa, Paris:Dance, Resonnance Four evenings with dance & projections with Muriel Jaër
- 1977 Festival du Théâtre Musical in Poitiers: spectacle Muriel Jaër & Etienne Bertrand Weill
- 1977 Third Bolzano Festival, Italy & second Autumn Musical in Como, Italy
- 1978 Projections for "L'Amour Sorcier", musique de Manuel de Falla, chorégraphie de Raphaël Agilar présented at Maison de la Culture d'Amiens, in Germany, Hollande & Austria
- 1978 International musical weeks, Orléans "Music for the Eyes" with Trio Deslogères & Muriel Jaër
- 1979 Diachronies For the "Ballet National de l'Opéra", music Béla Bartok, chorégraphie de Janine Charrat, scénographie images et costumes d'Etienne Bertrand Weill.
- 1981 Centre Culturel du Soleil d'Or, Paris: Spectacle-Dance, projections with Muriel Jaër by Etienne Bertrand Weill, Chant Silencieux
- 1981 International Musical weeks at Orléans; music, dance & projections with Muriel Jaër, the Trio Deslogères & Etienne Bertrand Weill: Prélude en silence, Hymnen, Rhétos, Tarquinia, Chtaslivi
- 1982 Shadow of a Mind, projections for mime performance by T. Daniel, Chicago
- 1982 Projections for Combat dans les Ténèbres by Marcel Marceau at Théâtre des Champs Elysées, Paris
- 1982 Festival International de l'Avant-garde, FIAG, Paris
- 1982 Heures musicales de Vernon, concert spectacle with le Trio Deslogères, new création: Tarquinia ( 2th mouvement)
- 1982 Festival: Trente années de Cinéma Expérimental en France, projection de Variations I & II at Centre Pompidou, Paris, Lyon, Lille, Montréal
- 1983 "Shadow of a Mind" presented at Istanbul Festival International & at Lubliana
- 1984 Future Shokk at Winnipeg, images & scénographie for a spectacle by Giuseppe Condello
- 1985 Interférences, visual & musical research with Marie-Françoise Lacaze at Colloque International Corps, Espace, Temps Marly-le-Roi
- 1990 Théâtre de Jérusalem theater, 22 march: Tsoar
- 1991 Pau (France): Interférence, Penderecki, Zeloa Music by M.F. Lacaze
- 1992 Habama, at Jerusalem: Penderecki, Alliance Française at Jerusalem shows with music by Bartok, Penderecki, Beethoven
- 1994 Auditorium of Israël Museum, Jérusalem: Music for the Eyes
- 1998 Tsaadim: Choreography & dance Tamara Mielnick, Music Steve Peskoff, Visual Création by Etienne Bertrand Weill, (five shows at Gérard Behar in Jérusalem)
- 1999 Six performances of "Tsaadim" in Jérusalem & two at Suzanne Dellal center Tel Aviv

== Bibliography ==
- Jean Hermann, Les Métaformes d'Etienne Bertrand Weill, Jeune photographie N° 58, January 1958.
- E.B.Weill, Les Métaformes, Aujourd'hui, art et architecture, N° 35, February 1962.
- Jacques Michel, Réalités invisibles, Le Monde, 30 March 1962.
- H.Galy-Carles, Weill Aujourd'hui, art et architecture, N° 37, April 1962.
- Jean Arp "Un Commerce de Lumières forgé avec le Surnaturel", publié dans Jours Effeuillés N.R.F. Paris 1966, page 157.
- Baum und Zeit im Bild vereint, Badishe Volkeszeitung, 8 April 1965.
- Michel F. Braive: La photographie dans le mouvement artistique actuel Connaissance des Arts, Paris, November 1965.
- Frank Popper, Naissance de l'Art Cinétique, page 45.Editions Gautier Villars, Paris, 1967,
- Frank Popper, Les Métaformes d'Etienne Bertrand Weill, Plaisir de France, N° 44, June 1969.
- Métaformes & kinetic suites, XVth birthday of Gens d'Images, 1969.
- Jean Claude Gautrand, Etienne Bertrand Weill, sculpteur de lumière, Photo Tribune N° 1, 1970.
- Léon Abramovicz, Etienne Bertrand Weill, Métaformes, Tribune Juive, March 1971.
- Charles Dobzinski, Le monde inconnu de Métaformes, Les Lettres Françaises, N° 1419, 19 January 1972.
- Entretien avec Etienne Bertrand Weill 1969, publié à l'occasion de Graphexpo 1972.
- Etienne Bertrand Weill; Images of trajectories of mobiles by means of photographs and cinema:
- Metaforms, Leonardo, pp. 301–306, Vol. 5, Pergamon Press Oxford, New_York 1972
- Kinetic art: theory and practice: selections from the journal Leonardo. Frank J. Malina. New York: Dover Publications. 1974. ISBN 0-486-21284-X. OCLC 969488.
- Regards sur la photographie créative française, Photographie Nouvelle, N° 59, 1972, Paris.
- Roberto A. Salbitani: Etienne Bertrand Weill, Progresso Photographico, Milan N° 4, April 1974.
- Gilbert Béville, Les Métaformes d'Etienne Bertrand Weill Revue Française de l'Electricité, N° 252, 1976.
- E.B.Weill, Intervention au sujet du film d'Agam au Colloque des Intellectuels Juifs de langue française, Le modèle de l'Occident, actes du Colloque, 1976.
- Martine Voyeux: La photo spectacle, interview d'Etienne Bertrand Weill, Photocinéma, N° 72, October 1978.
- Joëlle Naïm, Etienne Bertrand Weill, L'Arche, N° 517, March 2001
- Lapelletrie Fabrice: Diplôme d'études d'Art, 2010
- Lapelletrie Fabrice: Le spectacle musical de Métaformes. Revue d'Histoire de l'Art, Paris N° 62
