= Kinetic photography =

Photography technique that uses light and long exposure

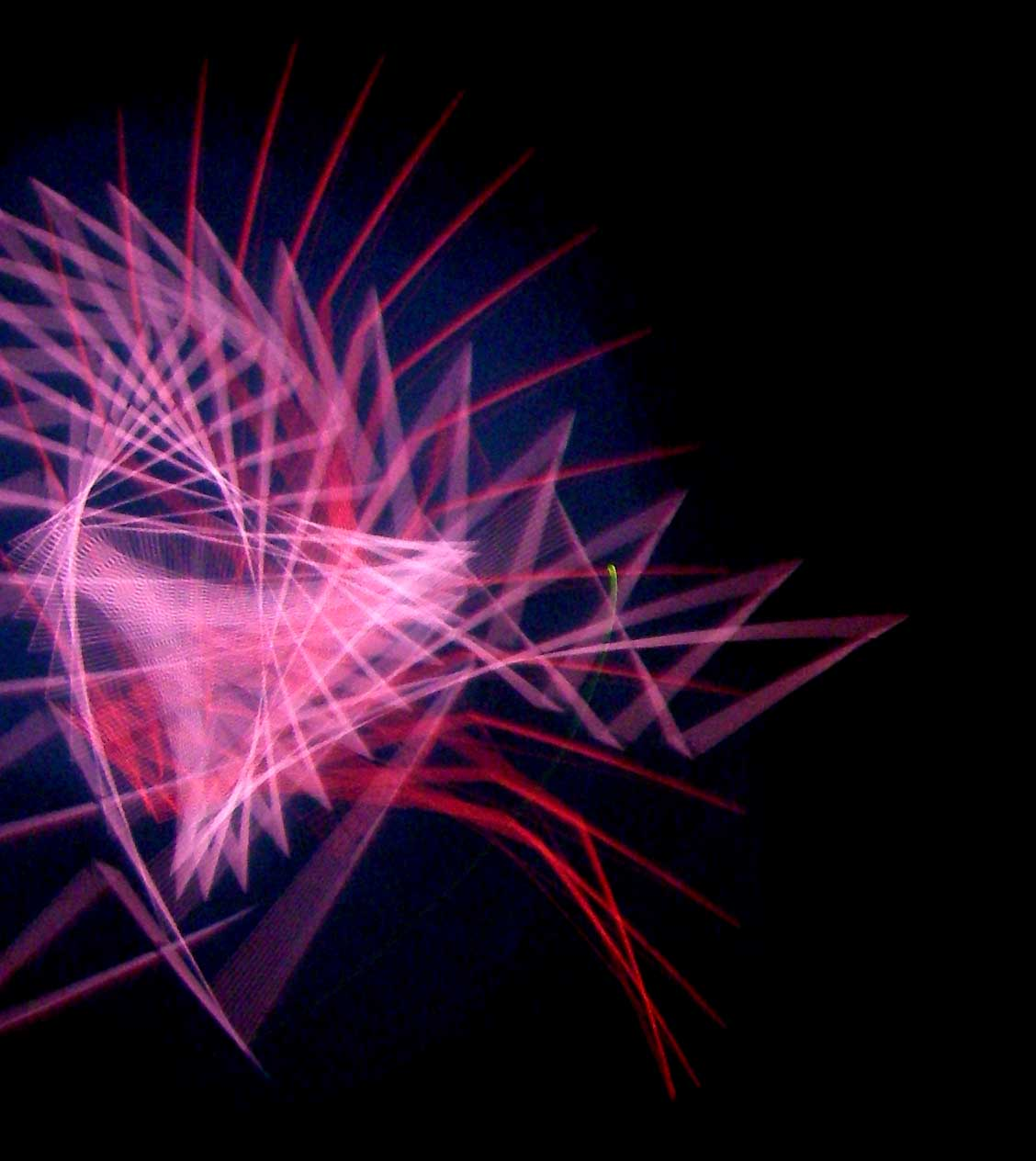
Example of kinetic photography in the form of a camera toss. Taken of lights in the dark with a long exposure in which the camera was thrown into the air as the photo was being exposed.

Kinetic photography (kinetic meaning "caused by motion") is an experimental photographic technique in which the photographer uses movement resulting from physics to create an image. This typically involves the artist not directly holding the camera, but allowing the camera to react to forces applied to it in order to make a photograph. This can include, but is not limited to; holding and shaking the wrist strap of the camera while taking a picture, dropping the camera off of objects while taking a picture, throwing or spinning the camera up in the air while taking a picture (called a camera toss), or rigorously moving the camera while taking a picture, etc. As the photographer has surrendered control over the camera to physical forces, this technique tends to produce abstract, random, or blurred-motion photographs.

== Camera tossing ==
Perhaps the most risky field of kinetic photography is that of camera tossing, in which the photographer literally throws their equipment into the air in hopes of producing an artistic looking image. Many camera tosses take place at night, when the camera is able to capture light with a long exposure, resulting in streaks of hypnotizing light patterns. The pioneer of camera tossing, Ryan Gallagher, hosts a blog on the subject in which he goes further into detail about the technique involved. The basics include using a timer or slow shutter speed, pressing the shutter button and quickly throwing the camera into the air (during, or just before, the photograph is taken) and then catching the camera before it hits the ground.
