= Benandsebastian =

Visual artist group

Benandsebastian is a visual artist partnership that was formed in 2006 by Ben Clement (born in 1981 in Oxford, England) and Sebastian de la Cour (born in 1980 in Copenhagen, Denmark). The partnership's intricately designed installation and detailed creations have been featured in Europe, the United States, and Japan. Benandsebastian reside and are employed in Berlin and Copenhagen.

== Artistic Practice ==
Benandsebastian's artworks use the language of architecture as an opportunity to address the relationship between the physical spaces of the human body and its surroundings and the psychological areas of the human mind. The duo's exhibition, Phantom Limbs, which took 'the presence of absence' as its common theme, showed at The Danish Museum of Art & Design in Copenhagen, Denmark from November 2011 until April 2012 and was on display at Trapholt Museum in Kolding, Denmark, until April 2013.
