= Barwoel =

Dutch small press comic magazine

'Barwoel'
- Frequency: Monthly
- Publisher: Self-published

Barwoel was a Dutch small press comic magazine, published from 1989 to 1995 in Rotterdam by Tonio van Vugt and his art academy friends. In 1995, this comic magazine evolved into the magazine Zone 5300.

== Development ==
The experimental comic zine Barwoel was created in 1989 by Tonio van Vugt and several fellow students from their time at the Willem de Kooning Academy in Rotterdam. In 1987, Van Vugt, Herman Jan Couwenberg, Henk de Bont, Finn Stapelkamp, and Rik van Schagen had first collaborated on a special "Was getekend" issue for the newspaper Het Vrije Volk.

Barwoel was one of the notable new-generation amateur comic magazines in the Netherlands in the early 1990s, alongside other groundbreaking comic zines such as Iris from Nijmegen, Posse from Amsterdam, and Incognito from Zaandam.

The issue was copied in black and white, and was limited to a print run of 50 to 200 copies. The first issue had a circulation of 70 copies, which gradually grew. One of the regular comics, Rik van Schagen's Stripstrip, appeared daily in the newspaper Het Vrije Volk starting from July 1989.

== Founders, artists, and writers ==
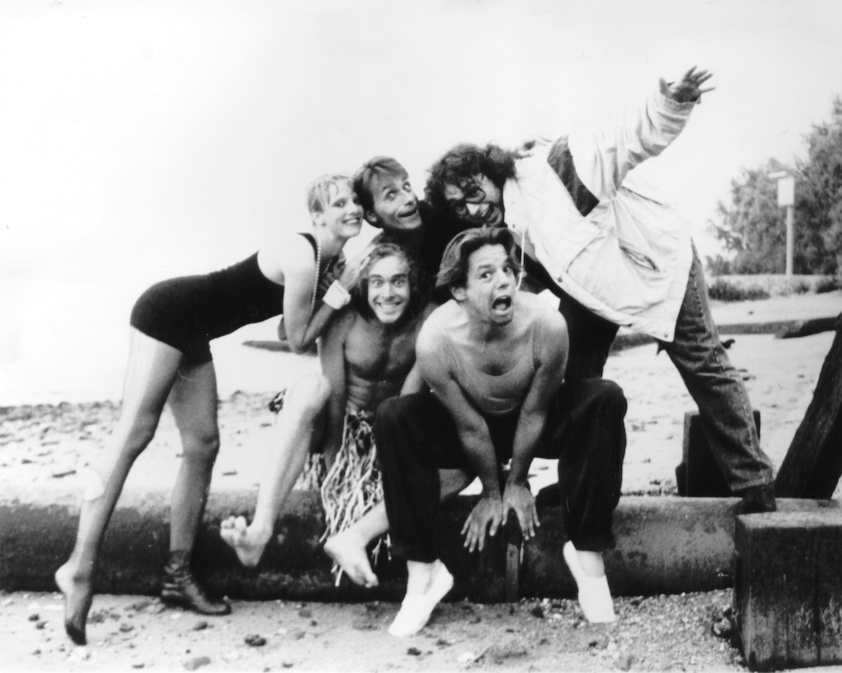
The extended Barwoela cast with left to right Gerrie, Tonio, Arjan (top), and Roel and Rimini (bottom) on the Rotterdam beach of the quarantine station Heijplaat, summer 1991.

The founders of the magazine were Finn Stapelkamp, Herman Jan Couwenberg (Djanko), and Rik van Schagen. Other early cartoonists and writers were Marianne Eijgendaal, Marco Faasen, Matthias Giesen, Gerrie Hondius, Joost Pollmann, Roel Seidell, Kees Torn, and Zookie.

In later issues, contributions also came from, among others, Marcel Ruijters, Gidion van de Swaluw and Wasco. In addition to comics, there were also some short stories and other content from various contributors. For example, the tenth issue included a lithograph by Sjenet Tepaske.

Through Barwoel, Tonio van Vugt came into contact with Robert van der Kroft in 1992, who two years later started Zone 5300 together with him. The comic magazine Barwoel continued for some time after that. Others in the core group went in different directions. For example, Marianne Eijgendaal moved to an animation studio in Ireland, and Kees Torn and Gerrie Hondius started the theater program Kees & ik.

== Special issues ==
The 10th issue was a special anniversary edition, with the cover featuring an image of the first 10 Barwoels.

The 17th issue was released under the title Barwoela and contained a photo-comic written by Barry Wulisch (Gerrie Hondius) titled Barre Tijden, Woelige Tijden (Harsh Times, Turbulent Times). In the photo-comic, she played the lead role alongside seven other comic artists.

The 34th issue was presented as the first comic magazine that did not have dog-ears and that you could enjoy under the dishes. It was published in the form of a music cassette.
