= Gabi Dao =

Canadian artist (born 1991)

Gabi Dao (born 1991) is an artist from the ancestral and unceded territories of the Musqueam First Nation (xʷməθkwəy̓əm), Squamish people (Skwxwú7mesh) and Səl̓ílwətaʔ/Selilwitulh Nations (Vancouver, British Columbia), who is now based in Rotterdam, the Netherlands.

== Education ==
Gabi Dao holds a Bachelor's in Fine Arts from Emily Carr University of Art and Design. The artist received the Portfolio Prize Award for Emerging Artists (2016), and was then shortlisted for the Sobey Art Award (2021). They pursued their postgraduate studies in Rotterdam, and graduated Summa Cum Laude with an MFA from the Pier Zwat Institute, receiving the Master Fine Art Research Award (2023).l

== Artistic practice ==
Dao's artistic practice includes sculpture, collage, moving image and sound installations. Their work has been described as having an emphasis on multiple truths, sensory affirmations, burry temporalities, and ways of knowing otherwise. They work through fluid processes of gathering, long-gestalting, tactile collections of whatnots and scraps of linguistic detritus. The artist faces Western ocularcentrism as well as the rigid binarism of capitalism by means of non-linear conceptions of time, memory and truth. In addition, Dao engages with community building and writing in their work.

They have exhibited their work at E-flux Screening Room (Brooklyn, USA), Southern Alberta Art Gallery Maansiksikaitsitapiitsinikssin (Lethbridge, CA), the National Gallery of Canada (Ottawa, CA), Radius CCA (Delft, NL) and Vincom Centre for Contemporary Art (Hà Nội, VN). Recently Dao was in residence at the EKWC (Oisterwijk, NL) and the Triangle Astérides (Marseille, FR). The artist is currently in residence at Jan van Eyck Academy.

They are known for the video Lucifer falls from Heaven at Dawn, which centers on the image of a bat in order to think about the intersections between economy and ecology, good fortune and perstilence, sound and sight, as well as belonging and alienation. The video was created as part of a wider body of work that also comprised textile and ceramic marionettes for the 2023 exhibition Hold these questions close at Unit 17 in Vancouver and the 2024 exhibition What breaks on the horizon? at the Southern Alberta Art Gallery.

== Select artworks and exhibitions ==
- What breaks on the horizon?, 2024
- Hold these questions close, 2024
- Lucifer falls from Heaven at Dawn, 2023
- Soothsay, 2022
- Many, Looks, Work, 2017
