= Per Abramsen =

Dutch sculptor

Pieter Abramsen
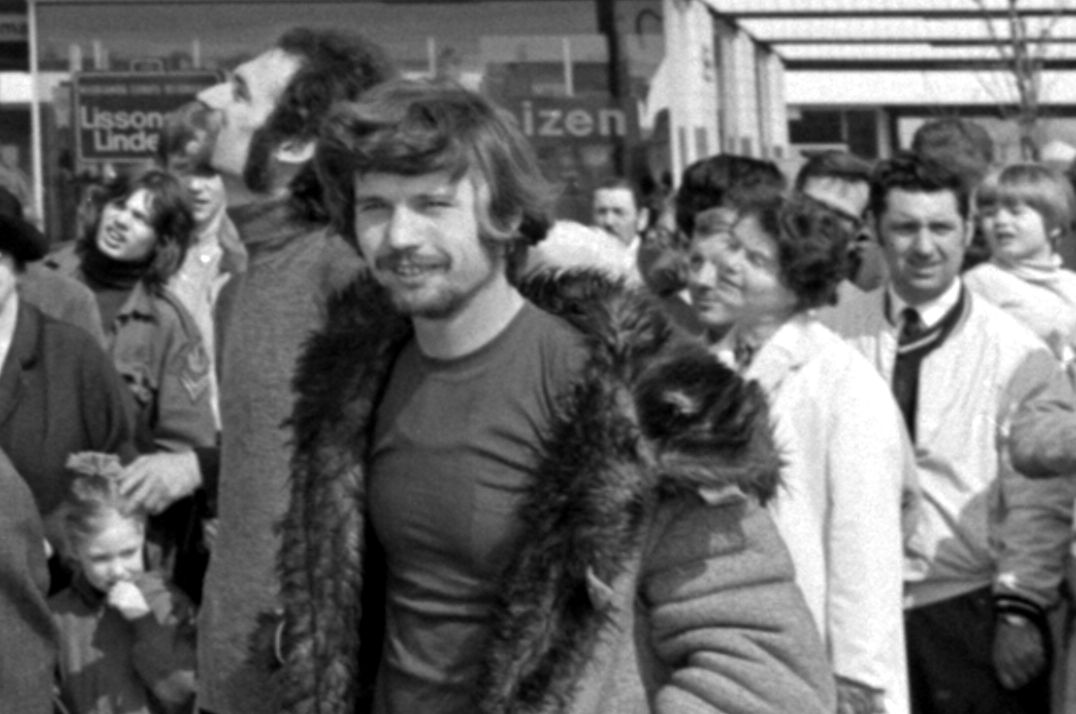
- Perry Abramsen, 1971
- Born: Pieter Abramsen; 27 March 1941; Rotterdam, Reichskommissariat Niederlande
- Died: 13 March 2018 (aged 76); Rotterdam, Netherlands
- Known for: Sculptor
- Movement: Abstract

Pieter (Per or Perry) Abramsen (Rotterdam, 27 March 1941 – Rotterdam, 13 March 2018) was a Dutch sculptor, and visiting professor at the Delft University of Technology, known for his work in which abstraction and realism are joined.

== Life and work ==
Abramsen lived the first years of his life in Rotterdam-Overschie . From 1957 to 1961 he studied at the Rotterdam Academy of Fine Arts and Applied Sciences, where he graduated as a sculptor. Abramsen started off as an abstract sculptor immediately after graduation. He lived and worked in Rotterdam and France.

From the beginning of his career Abramsen explored the possibilities of alternative materials working in wax, bronze, clay, (stainless) steel, sand, plaster, perspex, wood, polyester, rubber, stone, concrete and polystyrene (EPS and XPS). He explored the boundaries of the versatility of materials, learning many new techniques and researching new spatial applications. His work was exhibited in many galleries and museums at home and abroad and became a part of many museum, private and corporate collections.

In the late seventies figurative forms entered the abstraction and later on he also incorporated socially engaged subject matter in the so-called Table sculptures. In the early nineties Abramsen started experimenting with light and shadow in photographs, drawings and sculptures. He built his own bronze foundry several years after his graduation aspiring to keep the whole process of casting in his own hands.

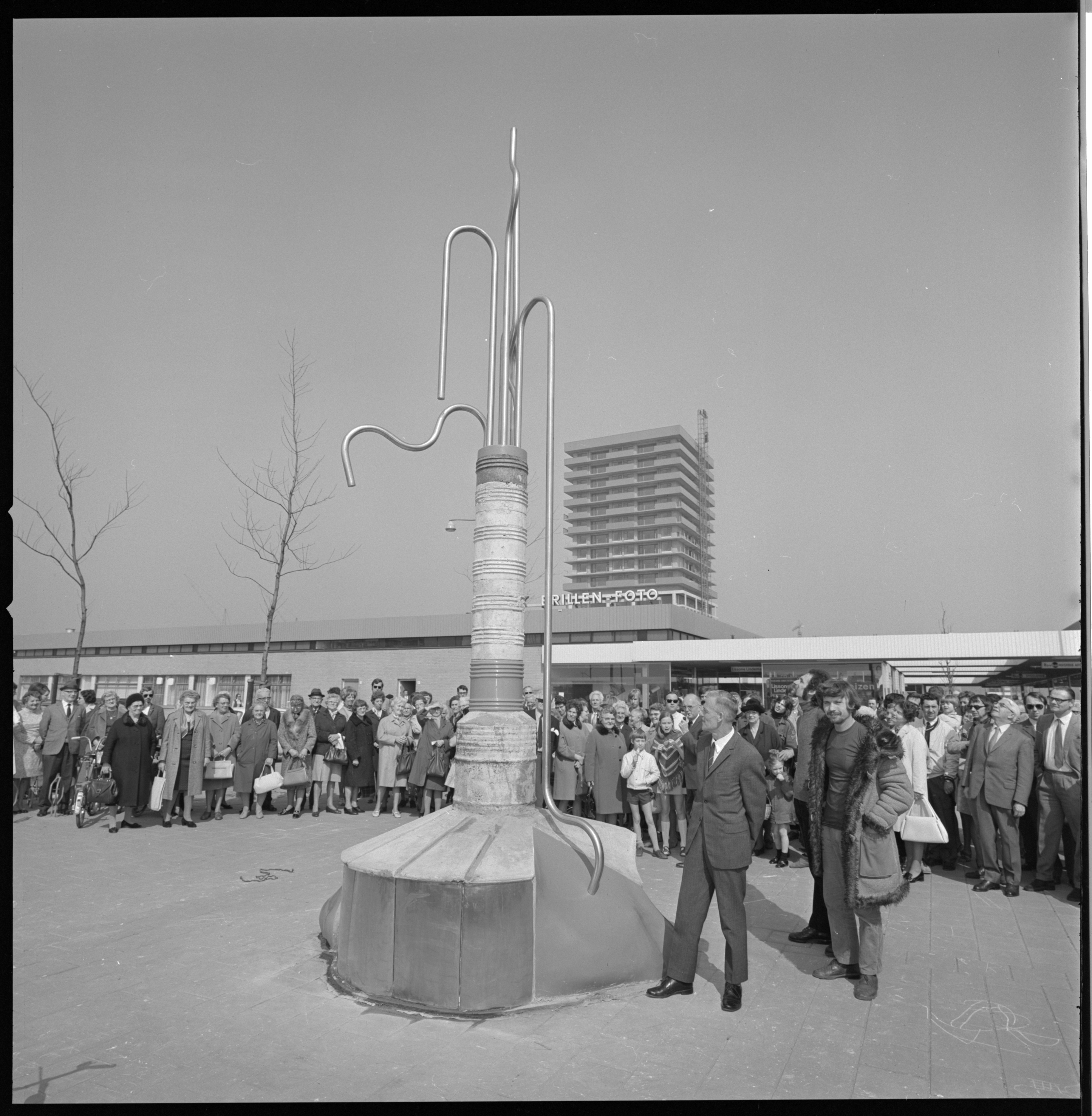
Presentation of sculpture "Baken" in Rotterdam in 1971

In 1969 a sculpture of Abramsen was donated by Siemens to the municipal of Rotterdam. In 1971 Abramsen and Rob Maingay donated the people of Rotterdam a sculpture of their own as a political statement, that artists don't only live on the costs of the community. This was the sculpture called Baken.

Abramsen also refurbished at least 15 houses apart from 2 industrial premises for RAM gallery and an office floor for Bill Alsop. To house the casting collective he designed a construction of containers. He built three steel shells for sailing yachts and designed and built two houses for himself with adjacent studios in France in 1980 and 2001.

He was the founder and chairperson of artist initiatives like SARK, STEK and a bronze casting collective called sCULpTUUR. Besides he was chairman of BBK Rijnmond, various committees, a guest teacher at academies and between 1997 and 2003 he was appointed guest lecturer at the Delft University of Technology.

In 1965 he won the second prize of the EMS Culture Award in The Hague with his work 'Arabesk' followed by the Jacob Hartog Award in 1989 with his work 'Les Voiles', also in The Hague. In 2020 the Per Abramsen Fund was founded.

=== Personal ===
In the early sixties he married his fellow student Berry Koedam. They had a daughter, Ilze.

== Works (selection) ==
- Baken (1971), Groeninx van Zoelenlaan in Rotterdam – with Rob Maingay
- Wandplastiek (1980), sports hall in Rotterdam
- Cones (1984), Baumannlaan en Absweg in Rotterdam-Overschie
- Al(l)ongée (1986), binnenplaats gemeentehuis aan de Herenstraat in Leidschendam-Voorburg
- Anamorfose (1996), Bachlaan in Barendrecht
- Light into the shadow (2011), Merwehoofd in Papendrecht
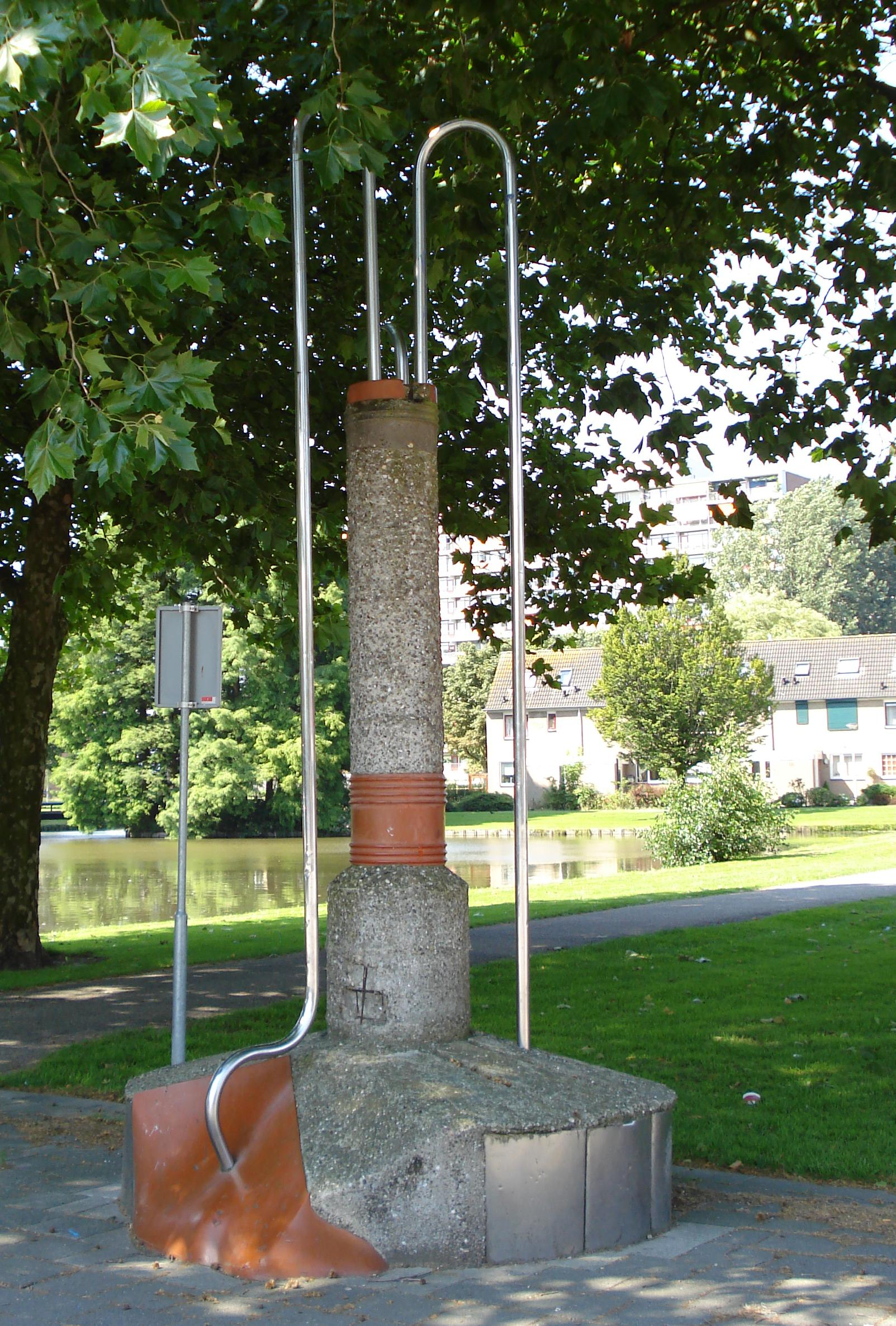
Baken (1971), Rotterdam

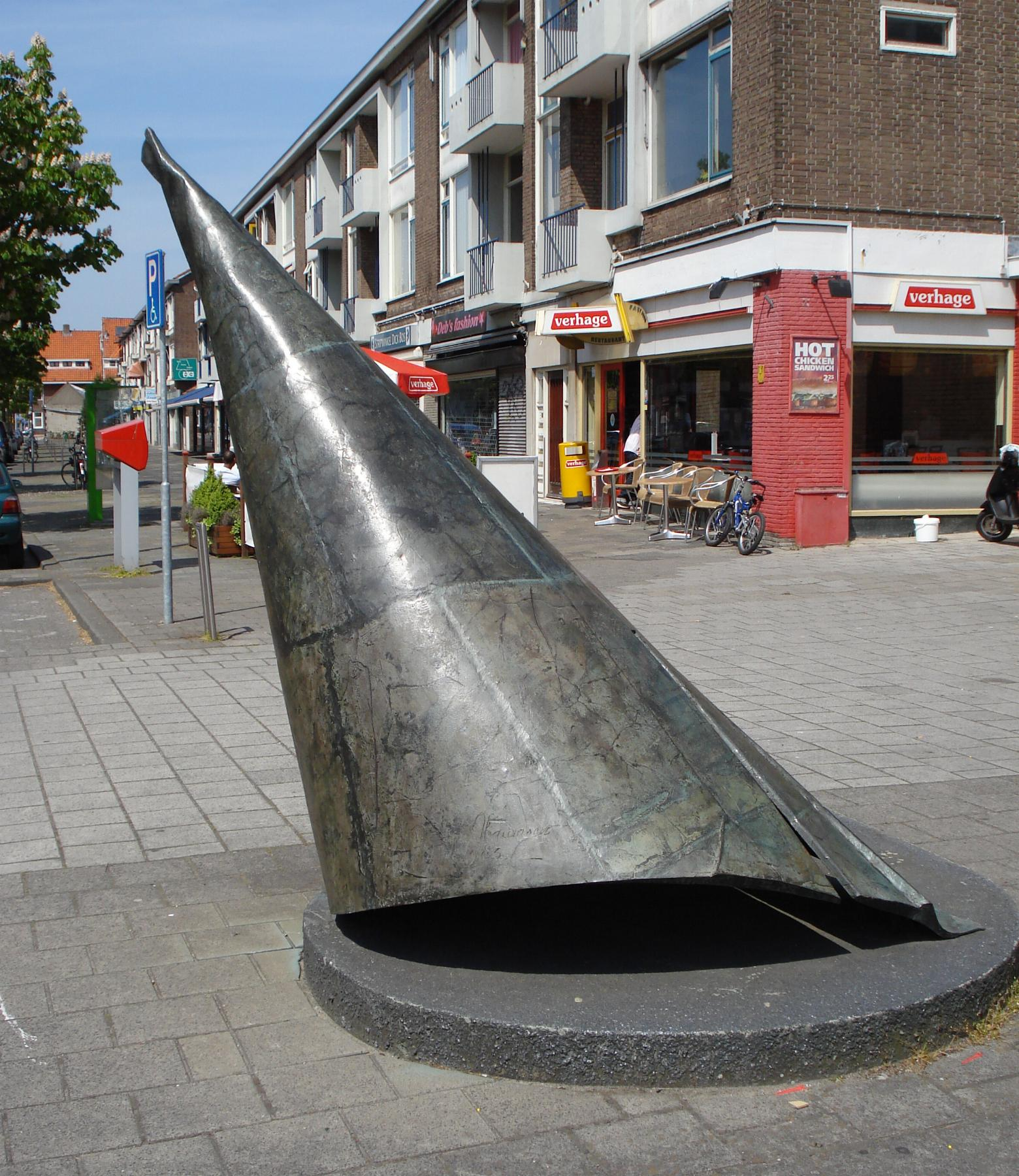
Cones (1984), Rotterdam-Overschie

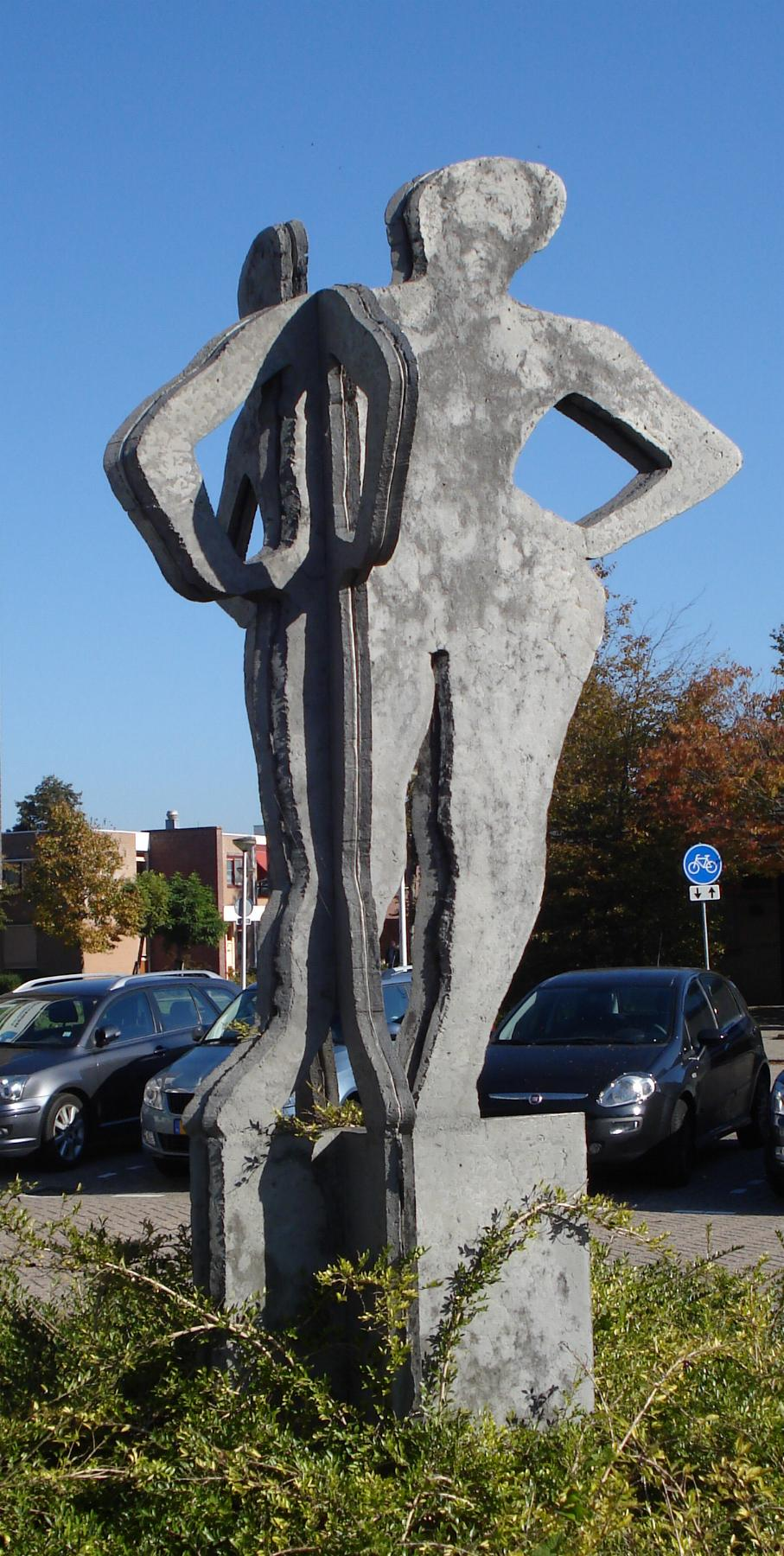
Anamorfose(1996), Barendrecht

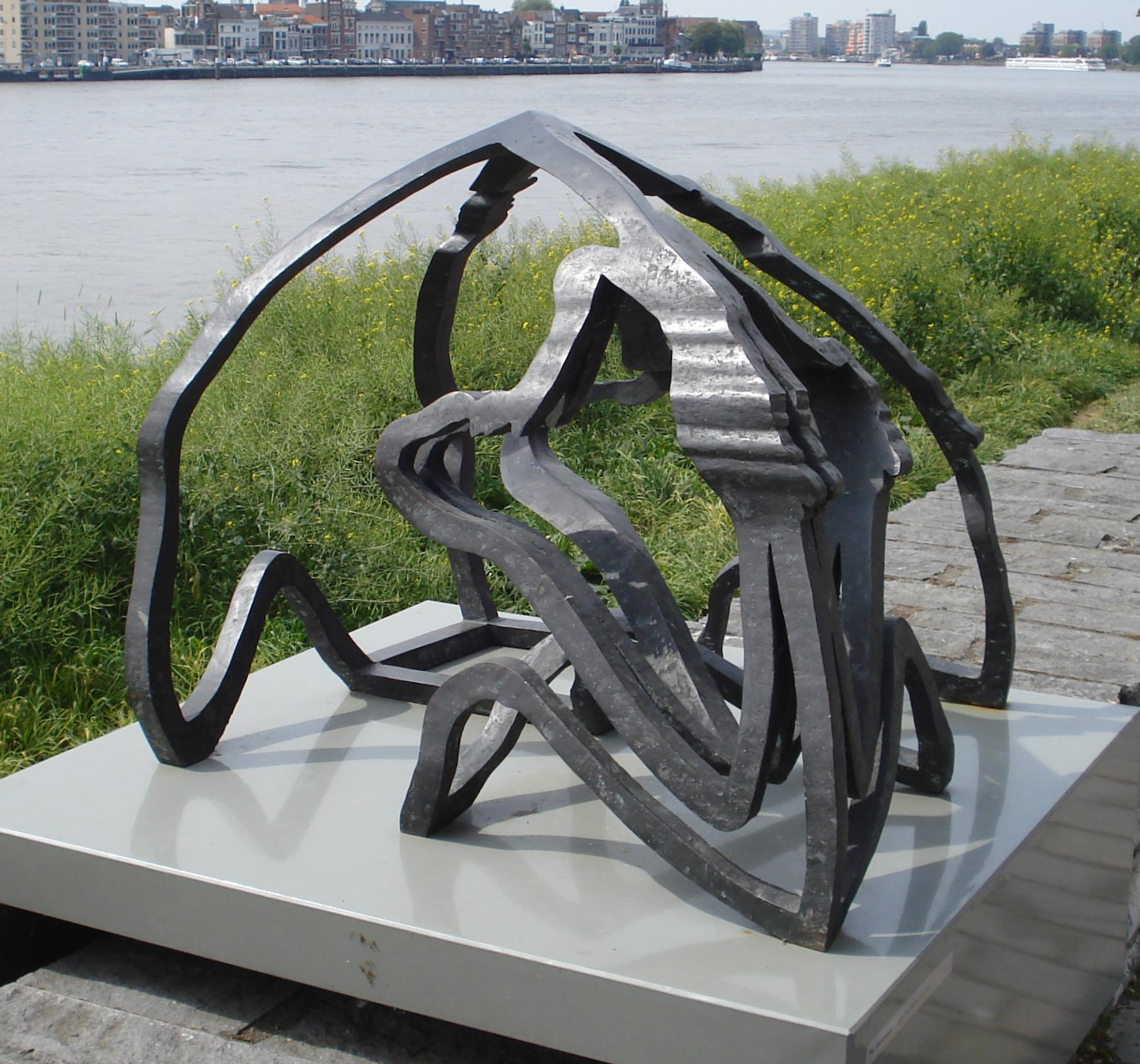
Light into the shadow (2011)

== Exhibitions ==
Abramsen was represented by RAM Gallery in Rotterdam. His work was exhibited in many museums at home and abroad e.g. a travelling exhibition of young Dutch talent organized by the Department of Culture. More selected exhibitions: Museum Prinsenhof, Keukenhof, Van Reekum Museum, Stedelijk Museum Schiedam, Dordrechts Museum, Gorcums Museum, Museum Zwolle, Museum Gabrovo, Groningen, Hilversum, Maassluis, Assen, Knokke-Heist (B), Kruithuis Den Bosch, Museum Uden, Museum Elctra Paris (FR), Middelheim Antwerp (B)Middelheim Open Air Sculpture Museum, Beelden aan Zee Scheveningen Beelden aan Zee and Museum Terra Rosa, Salernes (FR).

His work was also part of many sculpture trails in Diepenheim, Delft, Groningen, Sliedrecht, Dordrecht, Paris, Amsterdam and Rotterdam. He has solo exhibitions in galleries in France, USA, Belgium, The Netherlands and Germany and his work was presented on art fairs in Basel, Chicago, New York, Philadelphia, Marseille, Amsterdam, Rotterdam, Salernes and Nice.

Exhibitions, a selection

- 1966. Per Abramsen, sculptures, Ton van Os, graphics. Dromedaris Enkhuizen.
- 1967. Lentiade, Rotterdam Ahoy, Rotterdam.
- 1967. Sculptures of Perry Abramsen, Gallery de Haas, Rotterdam.
- 1968. Gallery 845, Amsterdam.
- 1968. Rob Figee and Perry Abramsen, De Doelen gallery Rotterdam.
- 1971. Middelheim Open Air Sculpture Museum, Antwerp.
- 1980. Solo, Pulchri Studio The Hague.
- 1985. Solo, Centrum Beeldende Kunst, Rotterdam.
- 1987. Solo, Verenigde Spaarbank, Rotterdam.
- 1989. Solo, Pulchri Studio The Hague.
- 1991. De torso in Nederland. Dordrechts museum.
- 1994. Beelden van Per Abramsen, Stedelijk museum Zwolle."

== Publications ==
- Abramsen, Per. Per Abramsen: sculptures. Transl. Chantal Stenfert Cloun... et al. Venlo: Van Spijk, 1985.
