= Mathieu Ficheroux =

Dutch artist

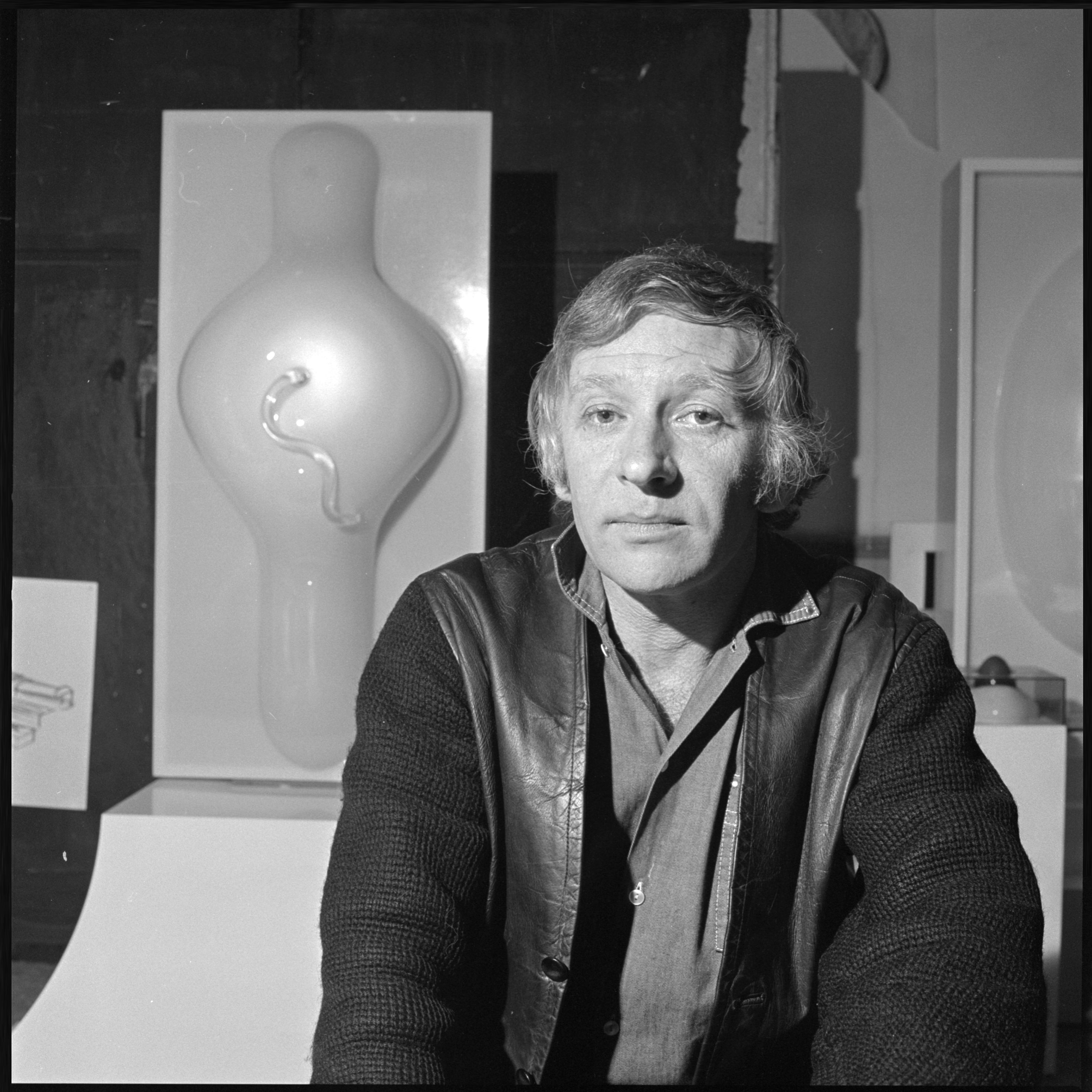
Mathieu Ficheroux, 1969

Matheus Josephus Lambertus (Mathieu) Ficheroux (22 April 1926 - 11 October 2003) was a Dutch artist, who worked as sculptor, glass painter, painter, draftsman, wall painter and installation artist. He is considered among the foremost Dutch artist of the second part of the 20th century.

Ficheroux is especially known for his 1960s "pink and brown paintings of objects of plastic and light reliefs (sleeping pieces), in which eroticism and alienation were important themes."

== Biography ==
Ficheroux was educated at the Academie voor Beeldende Kunsten (now Willem de Kooning Academy) in Rotterdam from 1945 to 1949, where he studied at the advertising and publicity department.

After graduation he was lecturer at the Academie voor Beeldende Kunsten from 1949 to 1953, where he taught fashion photography. As independent artist he started painting in 1955 and sculpting in 1960. His style of painting developed over the years: In the 1960s he made abstract expressionist paintings, in the 1970s "bad" paintings, and in the 1980s line paintings.

In 1969 he was awarded the Hendrik Chabot Award. In the same year he took part of a sculpture exhibition at the Twente University with Woody van Amen, Jan van Munster and other. A retrospective exhibition of his work was held by the Chabot Museum in Rotterdam in 2008.

== Work ==
The work of Ficheroux 's work is characterized by a carefully considered design and perfect execution, with elements of alienation, damage, and impair. One of his lines about his "bad" paintings was: "To complete a good work of art, you always need a little spoiling."

For example, Mathieu Ficheroux designed a Rotterdam monument for Louis Davids; a carefully crafted 78-rpm record, with as dramatic accent, a piece has broken off. Ficheroux also designed the Anna Blaman-price for Jules Deelder in 1988. It consisted of pure white, pure silk shirt, with a perfect disfigurement of an ink stain, which was part of the object.

In 1975 one of his most known works in a public place was revealed; a mural of Multatuli on the Mauritsweg above the bookshop Woutertje Pieters, a character in Multatuli's work. The mural contained the quote by Multatuli: Van de maan af gezien zijn we allen even groot (Seen from the moon, we are all equally sized). After the original building was demolished in 1985, the mural was relocated in 1987 at its present location at the corner of the Mauritsweg and Van Oldebarneveltstraat.

In the 1992-93 Ficheroux made large wall paintings in the former director offices in Hotel New York. In 1993 he also designed the sculpture Vergeten Bombardment (Forgotten bombardment) in memory of the bombing of Rotterdam West on 31 March 1943.

== Gallery ==
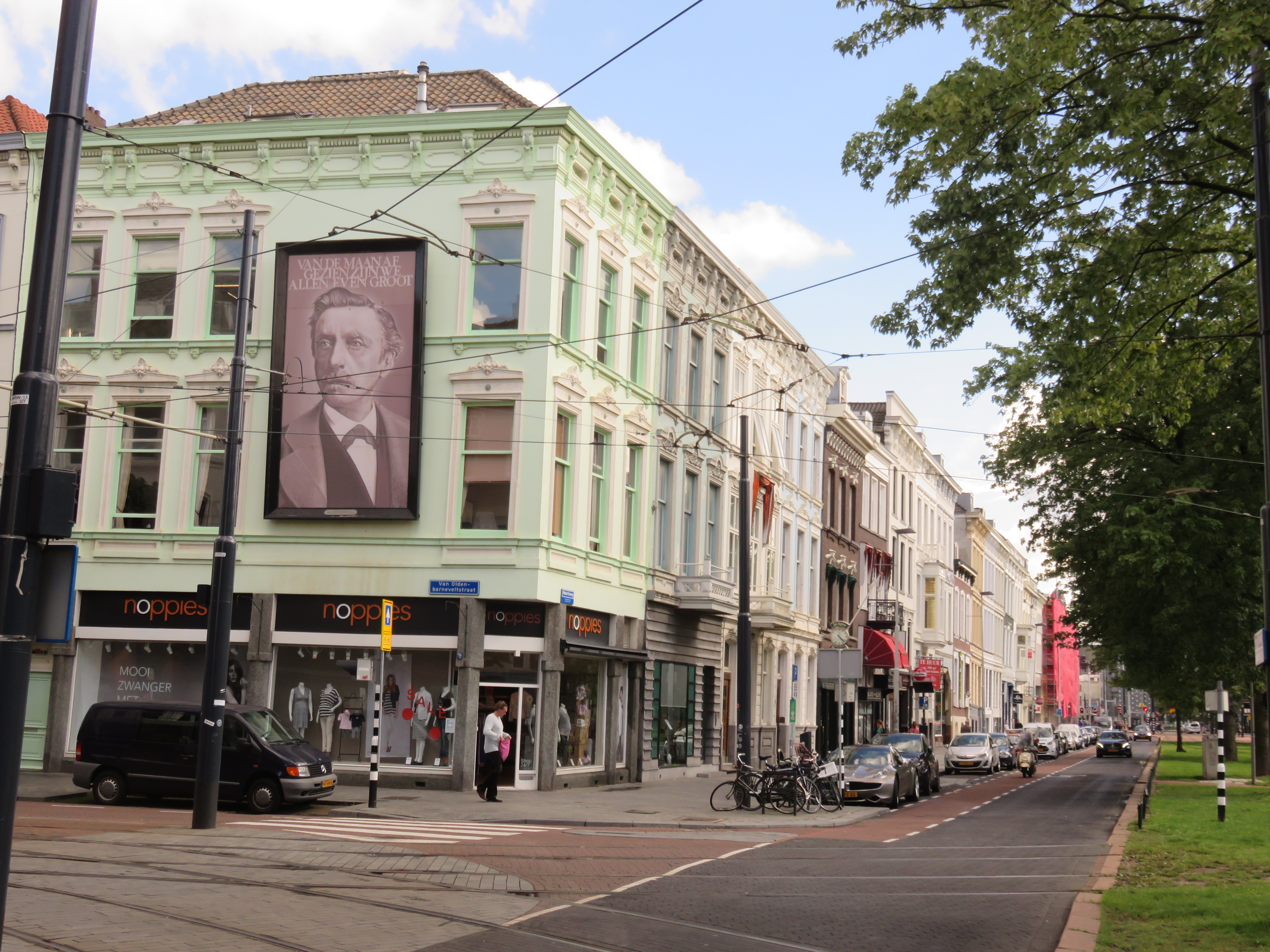
Portrait Multatuli (1975), Rotterdam

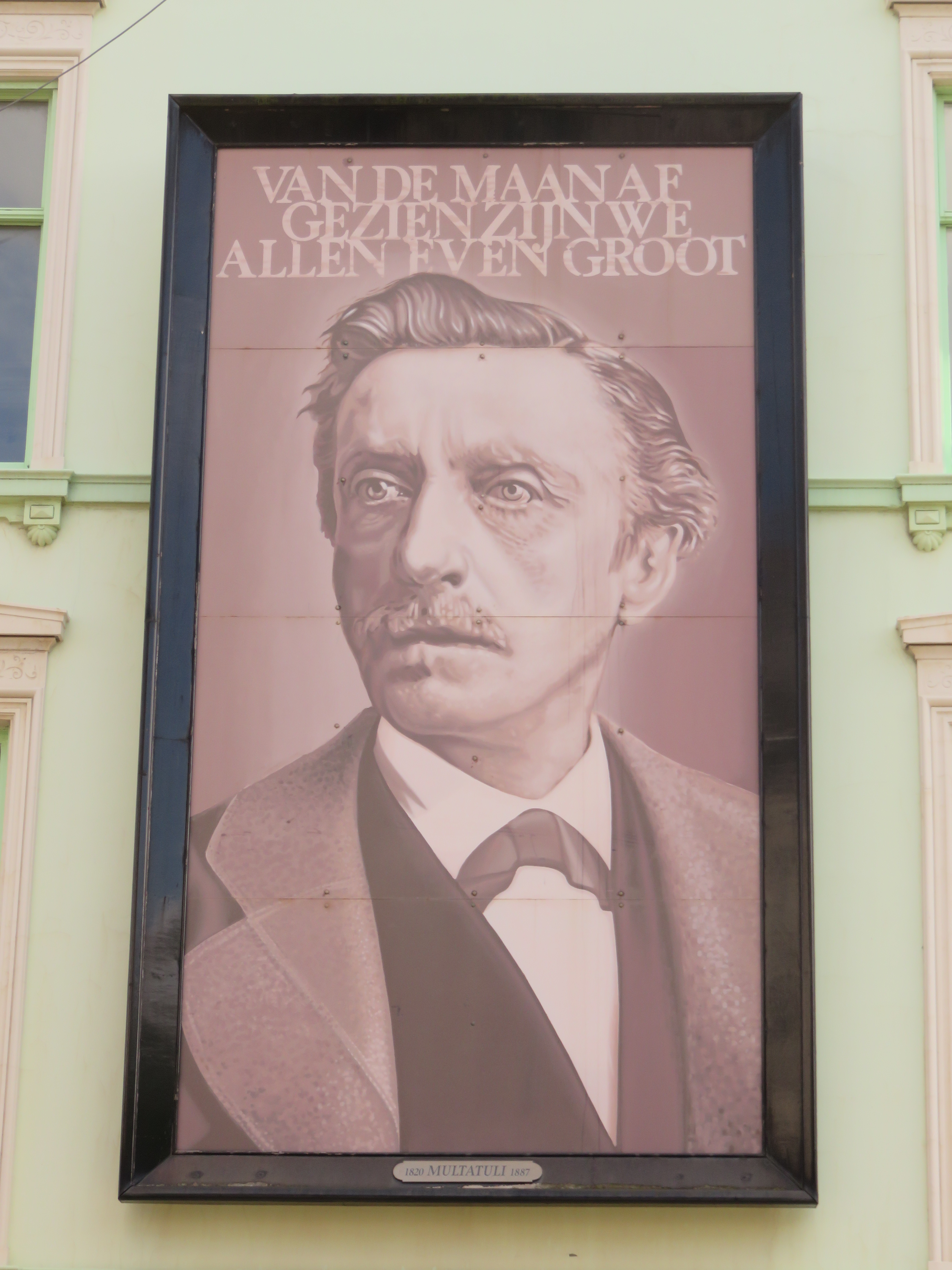
Portrait Multatuli (1975), Rotterdam

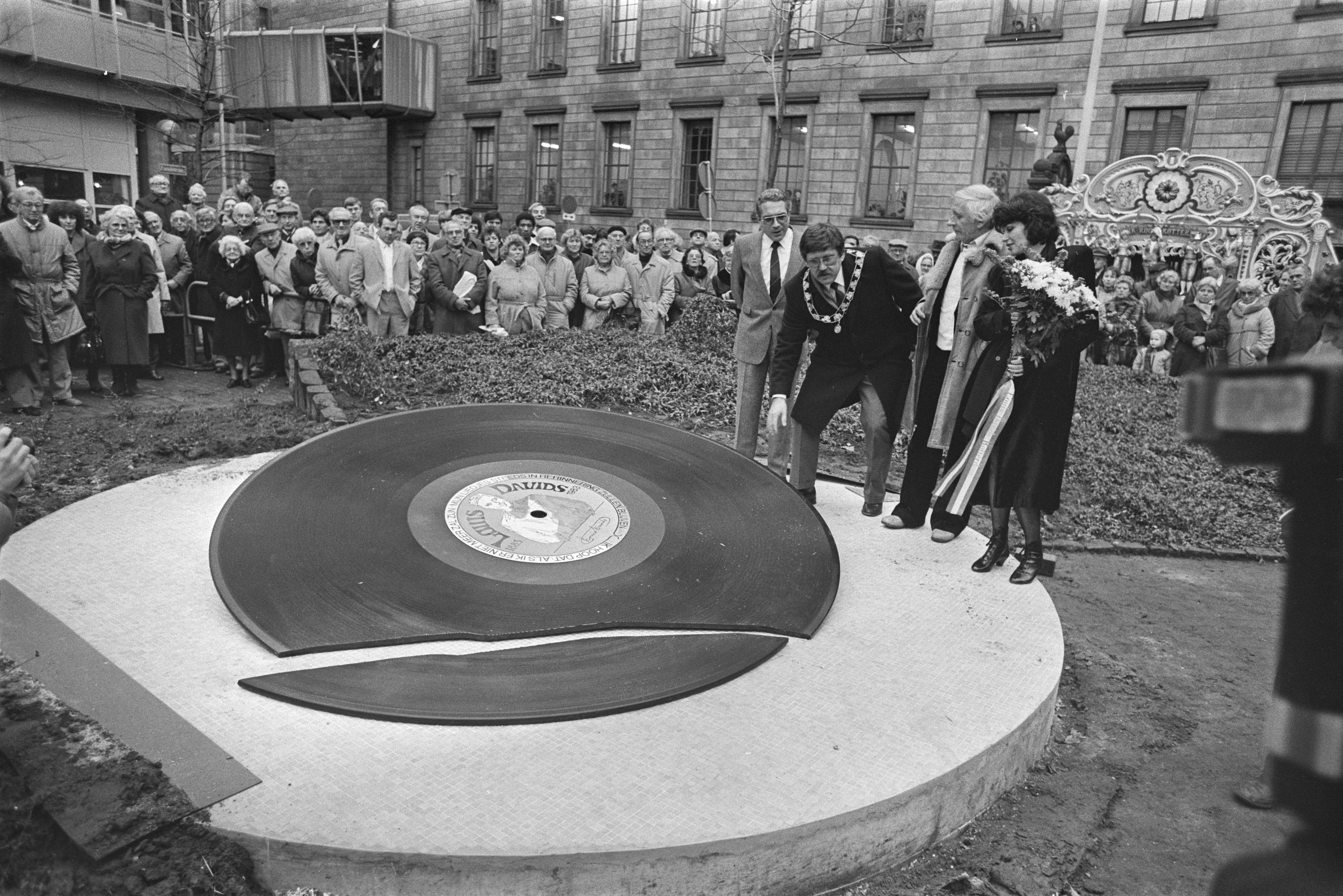
Disclosure Louis Davids monument in Rotterdam, 1984

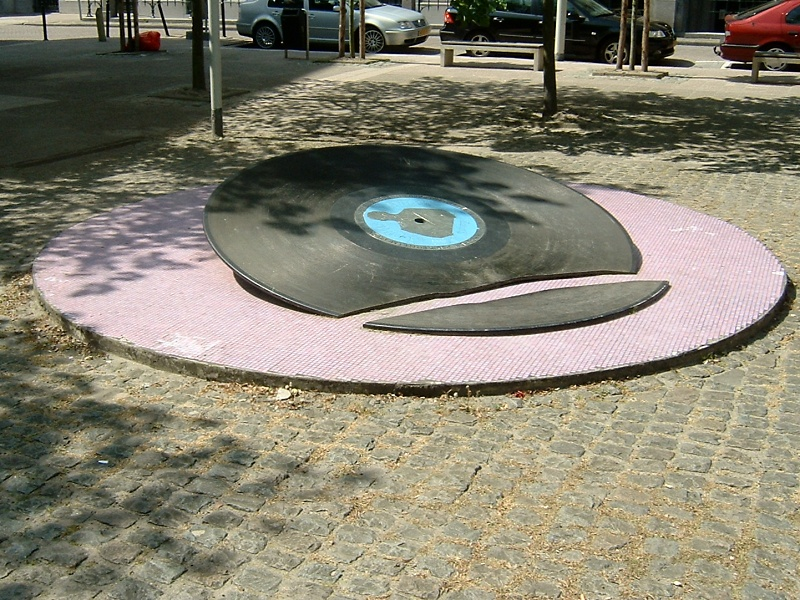
Louis Davids monument in 2005

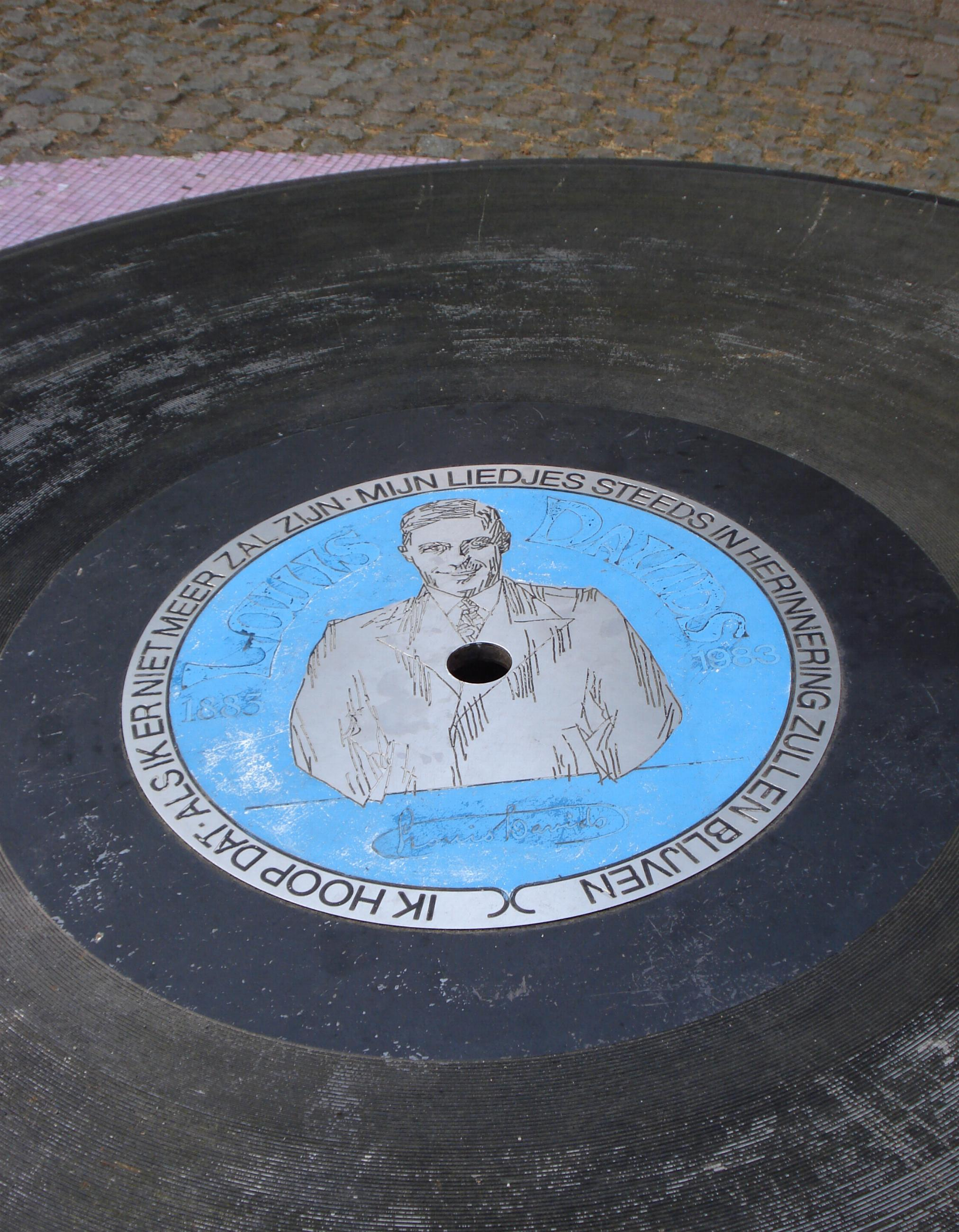
Louis Davids monument (1984), detail

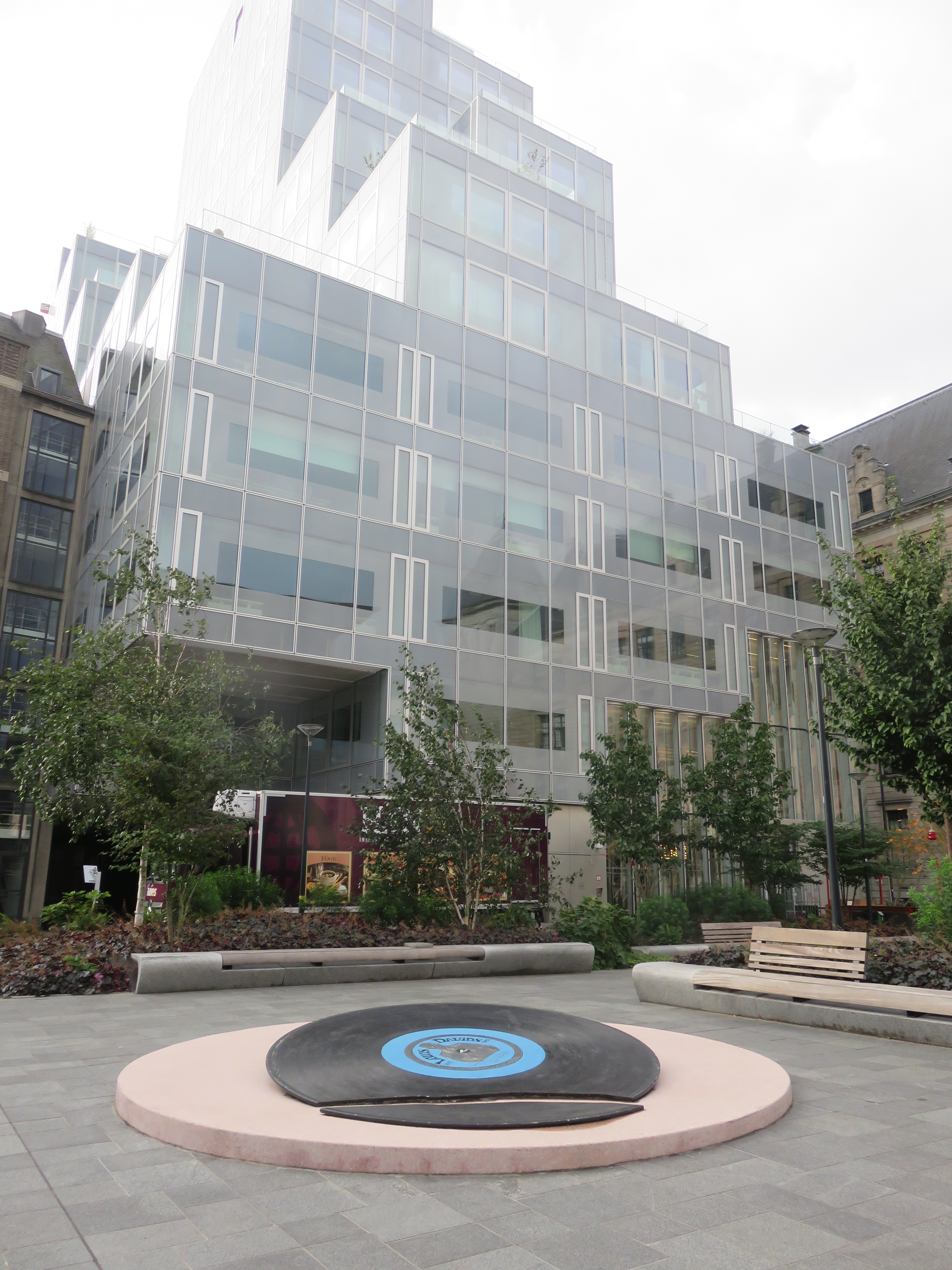
Location Louis Davids monument, 2018

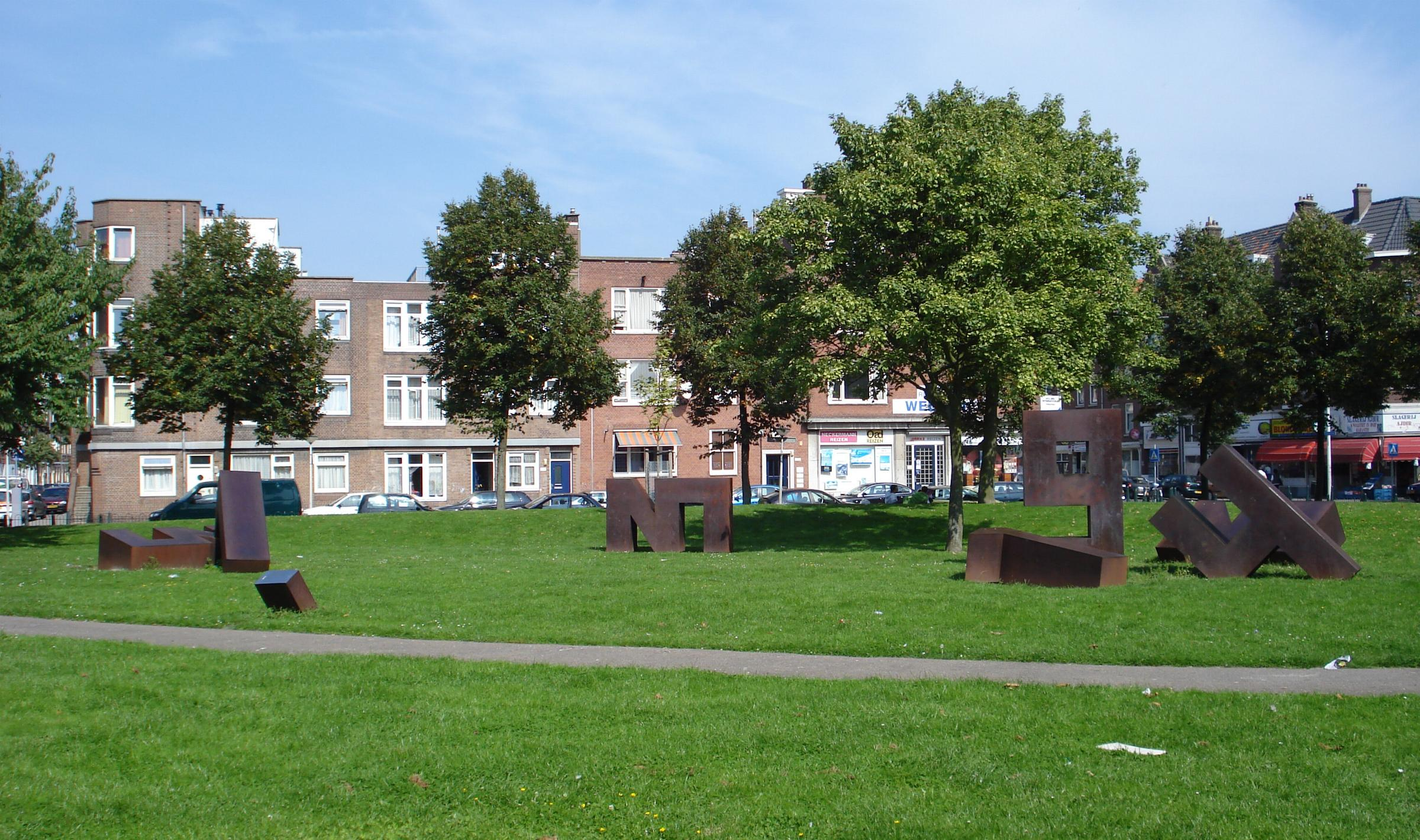
Forgotten bombardment (1993), Rotterdam.

== Art works in public spaces ==
- 1975, Portret Multatuli, Rotterdam
- 1979, Cast iron Thonet chairs in Rotterdam city center
- 1984, Monument Louis Davids, Rotterdam
- 1991, Monumental design Poetry International, De Doelen, Rotterdam
- 1993, Beeldspoor, Rotterdamse Schouwburg, Rotterdam
- 1993, Monument 'het Vergeten Bombardement', Rotterdam
