= Satin (disambiguation) =

Satin is a type of woven material with a glossy surface.

Satin may also refer to:

- Satin stitch
- Satin finish, a type of surface finishing
- Satin, Texas
- Josh Satin (born 1984), American Major League Baseball player
- Dennis Satin (born 1968), German film director and screenwriter
- Mark Satin (born 1946), American political theorist
- 4 Satin, a 1997 EP by Mogwai
- Satin, a character in the DreamWorks Animation film Trolls
- Satin (codec)

== See also ==
- Sateen
- Don Satijn (born 1953), Dutch musician and artist
