= Boris van Berkum =

Dutch visual artist

Boris van Berkum (born 1968) is a Dutch visual artist. His work combines ceramics, sculpture, performance, and installation art with influences from Delftware traditions, Afro-Surinamese culture, and colonial history. He works with materials including porcelain, bronze, marble, and polyester, while also incorporating digital techniques such as 3D scanning and 3D modelling. He lives and works between the Netherlands and Jingdezhen, China.

== Biography ==
Van Berkum was educated at the Montessori Lyceum and the Willem de Kooning Academie, both in Rotterdam, then at the Academy of Fine Arts in Prague.

During his time in Prague between 1992 and 1996, he worked as a cartoonist for the newspaper Prognosis.

He is co-founder and member of the Cool Clay Collective (CCC), an artist-led ceramic workspace and initiative in Rotterdam. Previously he was the founder and director of Showroom MAMA in Rotterdam between 1997 and 2007. He is the founder of and CEO of Mothership (2000–2005). Boris van Berkum is represented by Fontana Gallery.

Since 2013, Van Berkum has regularly collaborated with Winti priestess Marian Markelo. Their collaborative projects combine visual art, ritual, performance, and Afro-Surinamese Winti spirituality. This collaboration resulted in works including the Kabra ancestral mask, the Kabra memorial pin, and sculptures centred around the Winti deity Mama Aisa, including a presentation at Kunstinstituut Melly in 2023. That same year, the Mama Aisa sculpture was consecrated and introduced to the community by Marian Markelo during the Winti Bal Masqué at Theater Rotterdam.

Works by Van Berkum are included in private and public collections of the Amsterdam Museum, Museum Boijmans Van Beuningen, the Groninger Museum, and Kunstmuseum Den Haag. He has repeatedly worked at the European Ceramic Work Centre (EKWC).

Notable projects by Van Berkum include Kabra Blauw, the Kabra memorial pin (2023), developed in collaboration with Marian Markelo and NiNsee, and the olfactory art project Eau Décoloniale (2025–present), developed in collaboration with the Meertens Institute and presented at Missiemuseum Steyl.

== Positions and collaborations ==
- Co-founder and executive committee member, Cool Clay Collective (2022–present)
- Board member, Fonds Willem van Rede, Museum Boijmans Van Beuningen (2025–present)
- Guest researcher, Meertens Institute, Royal Netherlands Academy of Arts and Sciences (2025–present)
- Creative director, Winti Bal Masqué, Theater Rotterdam (2014–2025)
- Founder and artistic director, Showroom MAMA (1997–2007)
- Founder and director, Mothership (2000–2005)

== Group exhibitions ==
- 2024–2025 — In de ban van GOUD — Wereldmuseum Leiden, Leiden
- 2024 — Lievelingen / Beloved — Depot Boijmans Van Beuningen, Rotterdam
- 2023 — Rotterdam Cultural Histories #24: Mama Aisa — Kunstinstituut Melly, Rotterdam
- 2022–2023 — Unpacking Boijmans: Colonialism and the Collection — Depot Boijmans Van Beuningen, Rotterdam
- 2022–2023 — Healing Power — Afrika Museum, Berg en Dal
- 2021 — Healing Power — Tropenmuseum, Amsterdam
