= Frans van Straaten =

Dutch artist

- Born: 23 January 1963 (age 63); The Hague
- Known for: Sculptor
- Movement: Figurative

Frans van Straaten (The Hague, 23 January 1963) is a Dutch artist and known for his bronze sculptures. He is a figurative artist and sculptor, who creates bronze sculptures in which he unites force and movement.

== Life and work ==
In 1985 Van Straaten obtained his second-level teaching certificate in Drawing and Handicrafts. He continued his education in Rotterdam at the Willem de Kooning Academy.

Van Straaten is intrigued by the ancient Egyptians, Leonardo da Vinci and Michelangelo. In addition he is inspired by modern dance but stimuli from everyday life are still his main sources. His early works had a very impressionistic feel. Gradually his work changed and nowadays his sculptures are recognized for their strong lines and movement.

Not only private collectors are interested in Van Straaten's sculptures. Also many companies and municipalities own his sculptures. Highlights in his career are the unveiling of Stier in 2000, a monumental sculpture on a roundabout in Capelle aan den IJssel and the unveiling of Samengaan by Princess Máxima in 2003. Van Straaten's studio is located in Rotterdam.

== Exhibitions ==
Frans van Straaten has exhibited in The Netherlands and abroad. A selection of exhibitions:

- TEFAF, Maastricht, The Netherlands
- Miljonair Fair, Amsterdam, the Netherlands
- PAN Amsterdam, Amsterdam, the Netherlands
- Art & Antiques Fair, 's Hertogenbosch, The Netherlands
- Zamalek Art Gallery, Caïro, Egypte
- Dutch Art & Business Event, Doha, Qatar
- Lineart Gent, Gent, België
- Entre Rêve et Réalité, Monte Carlo, Monaco
- Feriarte, Sevilla, Spanje
- Art Expo New York City, USA

His work has also been shown in Switzerland, Germany, France and China.

== Books ==
- Frans van Straaten: Een kwart eeuw in brons, 2012, ISBN 978-90-818100-0-5
- Frans van Straaten: Kracht & Beweging 1988–1998, 1998, ISBN 978-90-901192-3-6

== Gallery ==
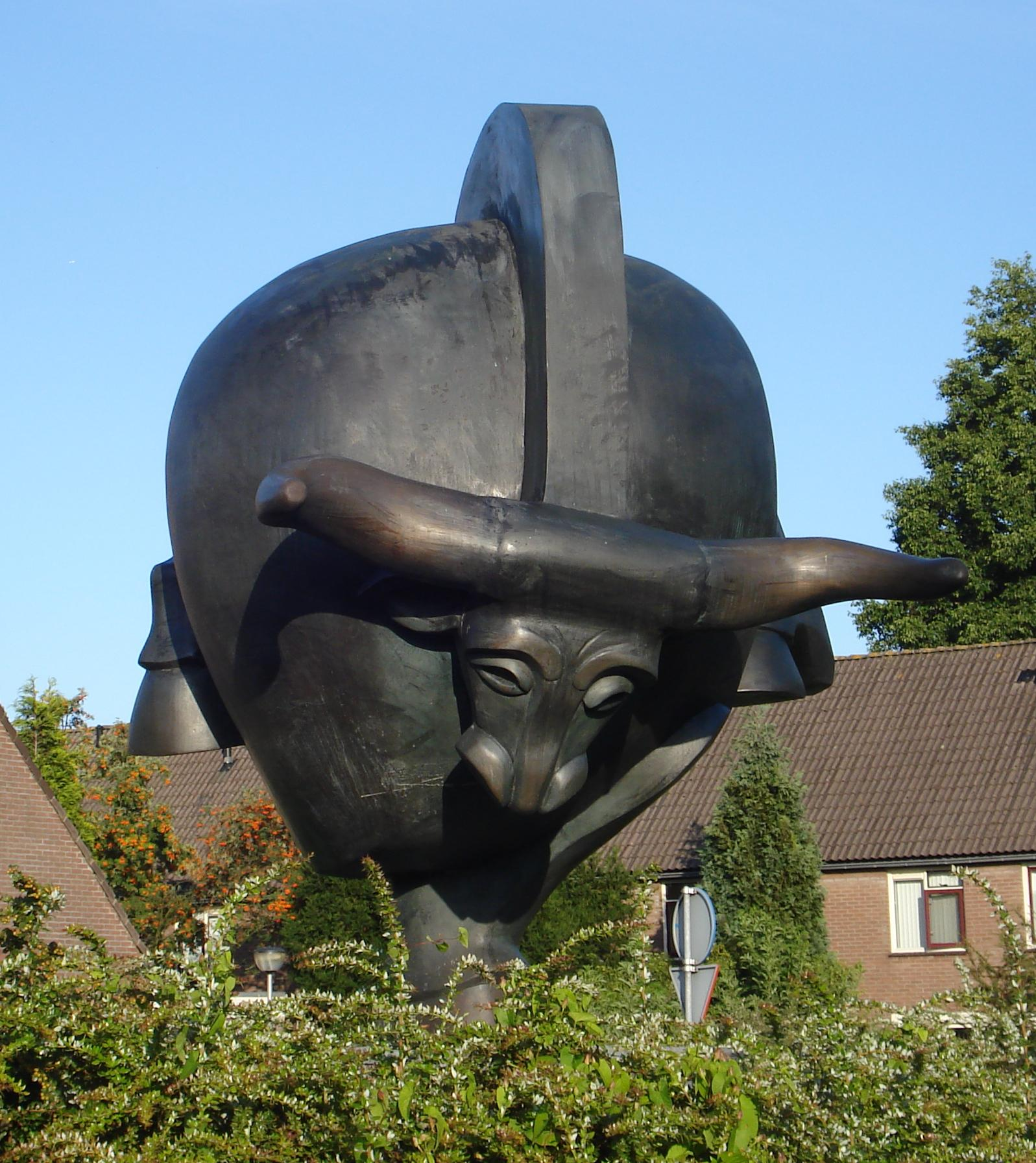
Stier, Capelle a/d IJssel, NL

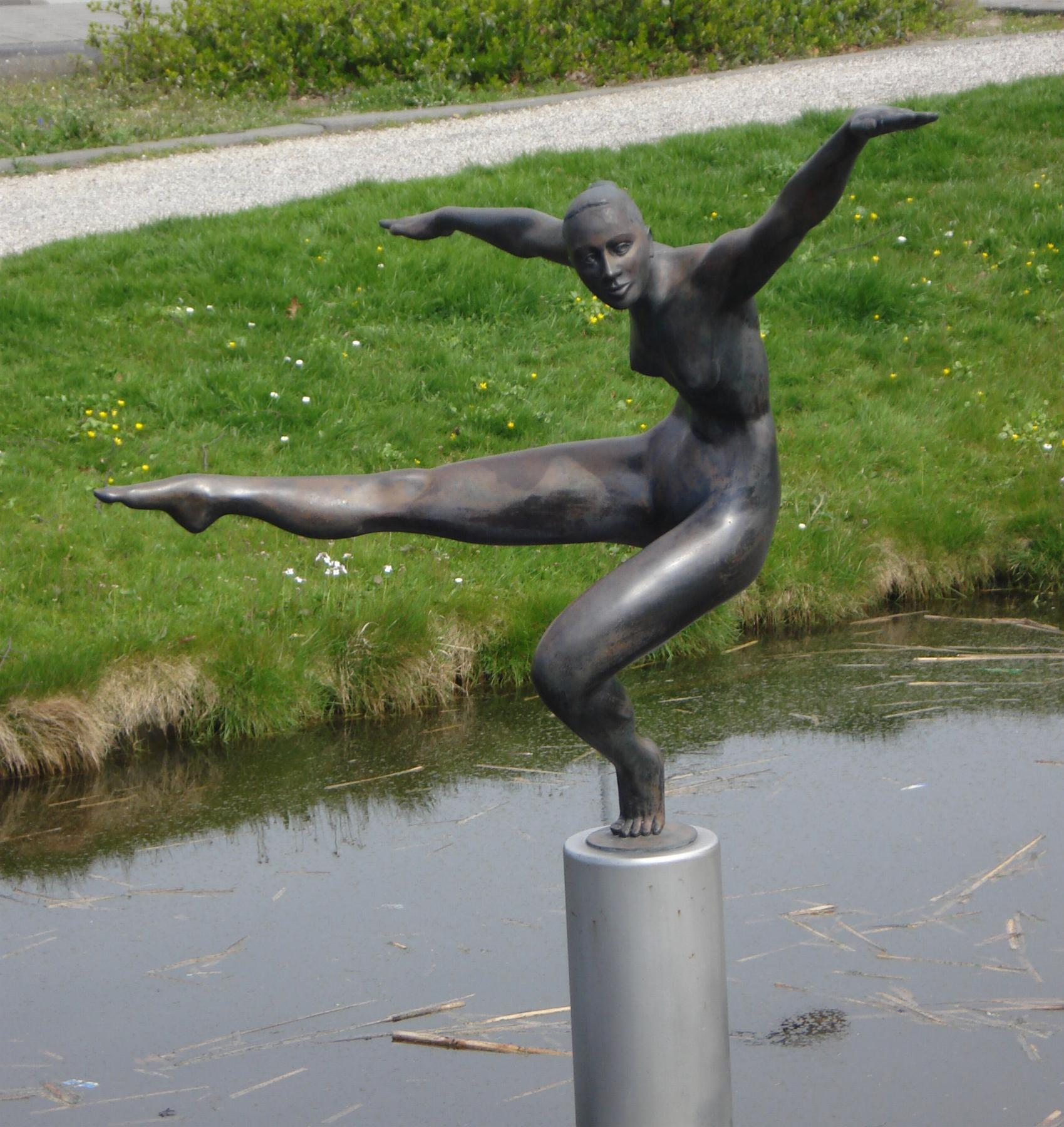
Zo Hoog, Alblasserdam, NL

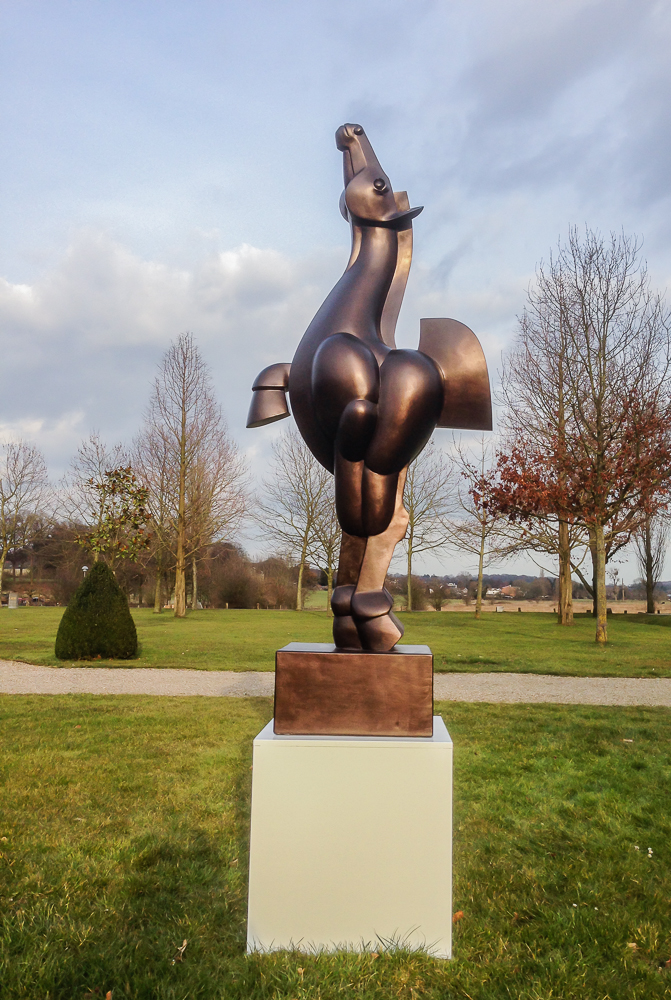
Prima Donna, Château St. Gerlach, NL
