= Piet Zwart Institute =

Art school in Rotterdam, Netherlands

- Type: Postgraduate Faculty
- Established: 2001
- Students: 70+
- Location: Rotterdam, Netherlands
- Website: Piet Zwart Institute

The Piet Zwart Institute is a post-graduate institute for study and research in art, media and design based in Rotterdam, Netherlands. Named in memory of the Dutch designer Piet Zwart, it was inaugurated in 2001. The current postgraduate study program structure had been introduced earlier in 1999.

== Overview ==
The Piet Zwart Institute is the center for postgraduate study and research of the Willem de Kooning Academy, Rotterdam's art school. The de Kooning Academy is a part of Hogeschool Rotterdam, a university of applied sciences.

The Piet Zwart Institute currently includes six Master study programs: Fine Art, Interior Architecture: Research + Design, Lens-Based Media, Experimental Publishing, Master Design, and Education in Arts. The Fine Art program is housed in a building separate from the main Academy building on the Karel Doormanhof 45 in central Rotterdam. It is also the main location for in-house public lectures. The main academy building houses the study programs in Interior Architecture: Research + Design, Education in Arts, and Lens-Based Media.

== Study programs ==
All Master study programs are two year full-time courses. They are based on the premise that contemporary art, design and media only exist in a wider social and cultural context, and connect artistic production and research with the public realm of discourse and display. With the exception of the Master of Education in Art which is jointly organized with the CodArts conservatory and whose degree is specific to the Dutch education system, all programs are held in English and have a highly international and multidisciplinary body of students and teachers. The programs are regarded as rigorous. The institute is highly selective with each of the programs usually only admitting up to around 12 students annually.

Since 2000, the study and research programs of the Piet Zwart Institute have published books on contemporary art, media and design in collaboration with publishing houses like Revolver Books, The MIT Press and OpenMUTE. The institute also collaborates with local organizations such as TENT/Centrum voor Beeldende Kunst, Witte de With, V2 Institute for the Unstable Media, Boijmans van Beuningen Museum, WORM, Duende, Het Wilde Weten and Goethe-Institut Rotterdam. The academic degree of Masters is validated by the NVAO, the joint accreditation organization of the Dutch and Flemish ministries of education.

== Research programs ==
Since 2002, the Piet Zwart Institute initiated three research programs, Media Design Research (2002–2006, led by Matthew Fuller) and Communication in a Digital Age (since 2008, led by Florian Cramer) and Cultural Diversity (since 2010, led by Hugo Bongers). Research fellows included Lev Manovich, Bureau of Inverse Technology, jodi, Simon Yuill and Alessandro Ludovico. Among the publications were an early handbook on open content licenses written by Lawrence Liang and the anthology Software Studies (ed. by Matthew Fuller, The MIT Press, 2008).

== Location ==
The Piet Zwart Institute is spread over two locations in the center of the port town of Rotterdam, Netherlands, on the Karel Doormanhof 45 and the main building of the Willem de Kooning Academy, Blaak 10.

== International talent ==
The Institute is regarded as selective with rigorously intensive and highly international study programs. Students get the chance to develop, present and exhibit their work and research nationally and internationally during their time of study, and are exposed to meetings and opportunities with prominent international practitioners and theoreticians in their respective field of study. Students also get the opportunity to visit international events relevant to their study and work, such as art biennials, media and design festivals and cultural studies conferences.

The Fine Art and Networked Media programs also hold annual graduation shows at major art venues in Rotterdam; in the past, they included the Boijmans van Beuningen museum, TENT, Centrum voor Beeldende Kunst Rotterdam and WORM. Recent exhibition titles include: Never Odd or Even and Global/Positions/Systems, 2009, My Travels with Barry and YOU ARE PWNED, 2008.

== Staff ==
All study and research programs are based on a small core staff and a great number of visiting tutors. Course directors have been Anke Bangma (1999–2007) and Vanessa Ohlraun (since 2007) for Fine Art, Raphael van Amerongen (2001–2007) and Margaret Wijnands (since 2008) for Retail Design, Alex Suarez (since 2010) for Interior Architecture, Matthew Fuller (2002–2006), Florian Cramer (2006–2010) and Renee Turner (since 2010) for Networked Media, Simon Pummell (since 2009) for Lens-Based Digital Media, Robin Punt (2006–2010), Mirjam van Tilburg (since 2010) and Jojanneke Gijsen for Education in Art.

Some notable staffers and regular tutors include:

- Rodney Fitch (Interior Architecture and Retail Design)
- Ine Lamers

Some notable guest tutors and lecturers include:

- Will Holder (designer)
- Georg Schöllhammer
- jodi
- ubermorgen.com
- Lev Manovich
- Inke Arns
