= Agnes Canta =

Dutch painter

- Portrait of Agnes Canta in 1952
- Born: 14 November 1888; Rotterdam, Netherlands
- Died: 8 August 1964 (aged 75); Rotterdam, Netherlands
- Occupation: Painter

Agnes Catharina Canta (14 November 1888 – 8 August 1964) was a Dutch painter, best known for poster design.

Canta was a granddaughter of painter Johannes Canta. She took art lessons in Academie van Beeldende Kunsten in Rotterdam. She first painted landscapes and still-lives, but eventually switched to designing posters and book covers, as well as to murals. She had her first personal exhibition in 1926. In the beginning of the 1930s, Canta designed many posters, in particular, for the Nederlandse Spoorwegen (1931) and for the Jaarbeurs (since 1932). Specifically, her September 1933 poster for the Jaarbeurs, inspired by The Great Wave off Kanagawa by Hokusai, was considered to be very successful. Before WWII, Canta was the only woman who designed posters for the Nederlandse Spoorwegen. Canta also took part in the creation of the Dutch pavilion at the World's Fair in Antwerp in 1930. Her work was part of the painting event in the art competition at the 1932 Summer Olympics. Canta stayed in Rotterdam during the German occupation.

Agnes Canta died in 1964 in her apartment which was next to her atelier at Jan Kruijffstraat in Delfshaven, living alone.

In 1992, a street in Rotterdam, Agnes Cantastraat, was named after Canta.
