= Flor Silvester =

Dutch painter (1923–2008)

Florus "Flor" Silvester (30 August 1923 in Rotterdam – 2 December 2008 in Dordrecht), sometimes misspelled as Silvestre, was a Dutch graphic designer, illustrator, painter, and sculptor. Silverster's designs won him the Eurostar for packaging and the Golden Nut. He designed and illustrated many Dutch books and designed some classic posters.

== Life ==
Flor Silvester studied at the Willem de Kooning Academy, then known as the Volksindustrieschool or the Rotterdamse Academie. Among his teachers were Aart Glansdorp, David Bautz, and Kees van Roemburg. Flor Silvester lived in Rotterdam, Utrecht, and Hendrik-Ido-Ambacht. In H.I. Ambacht his studio was in his home on the Reeweg.

Flor played the trombone in several bands. In 1995 he participated in the 25th Jazz Festival of Breda.

Flor Silvester was married to Elizabeth van Dijk. They had three children.
