= Willem de Kooning Academy =

Art school in Rotterdam, Netherlands

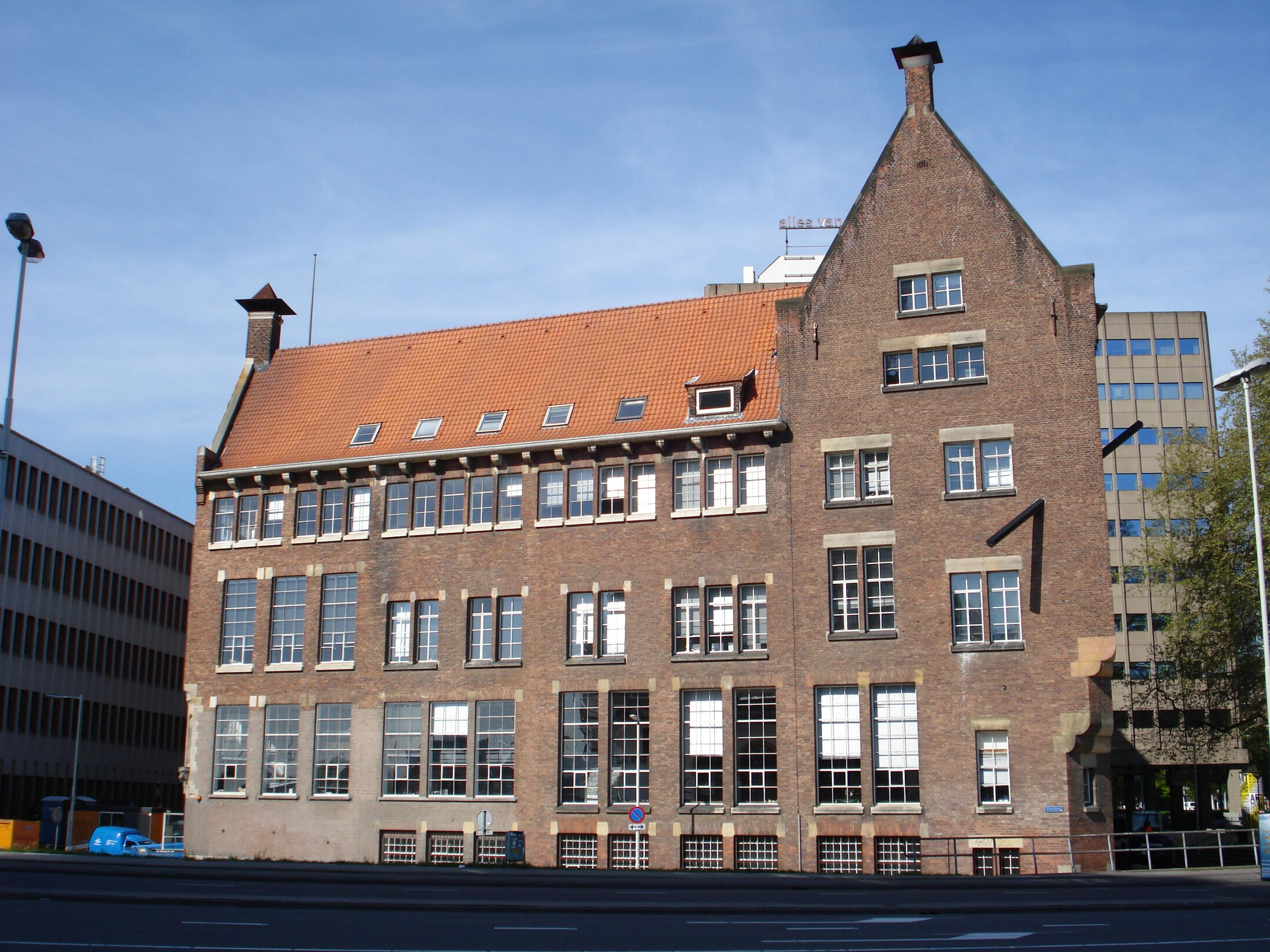
- Established: 1773 Hierdoor tot Hooger; 1998 Willem de Kooning Academie
- Students: 2,100+ undergraduate and graduate
- Location: Rotterdam, Netherlands
- Website: www.wdka.nl

The Willem de Kooning Academy (Dutch: Willem de Kooning Academie) is a Dutch academy of media, art, design, leisure and education based in Rotterdam. It was named after one of its most famous alumni, Dutch fine artist Willem de Kooning.

== Overview ==
The Willem de Kooning Academy is the art school of Rotterdam and part of the Rotterdam University of Applied Sciences (RUAS). Previously called the Academie van Beeldende Kunsten (Academy of Visual Arts), it has since 1998 carried the name of alumnus Willem de Kooning (1904–1997). Willem de Kooning was born in north Rotterdam and graduated in decoration art (now styling). He went to New York at the age of 22 and became a frontman of the Abstract Expressionism painting movement of the 1940s and 1950s.

The academy's postgraduate programmes are housed in the Piet Zwart Institute, named after faculty alumnus Piet Zwart (1885–1977). Zwart designed stamps, print advertising, books, interiors, furniture (including the Bruynzeel kitchen) in the 1920s and also spent time photographing and painting. He has been officially awarded the title Dutch Designer of the 20th Century, and both de Kooning and Zwart act as inspirations to both students and faculty members.

== History ==
The roots of the art academy in Rotterdam go back to 1773, when a group of Rotterdam artists around the marine painter Hendrik Kobell founded the drawing society Tekengenootschap Hierdoor tot Hooger. In those days drawing societies and academies were founded in many Dutch cities. According to Knolle (2014), these were "instances where new ideas about the production and function of art were developed, exchanged and put into practice. New arrived painters practiced themselves in the evening in drawing from the nude; young apprentice artists and craftsmen received drawing education; other enthusiasts developed their sense for art, for a better life, but also to judiciously collect—preferably Dutch—art."

Fashion show by students of the Rotterdam Academy of Fine Arts, 1960

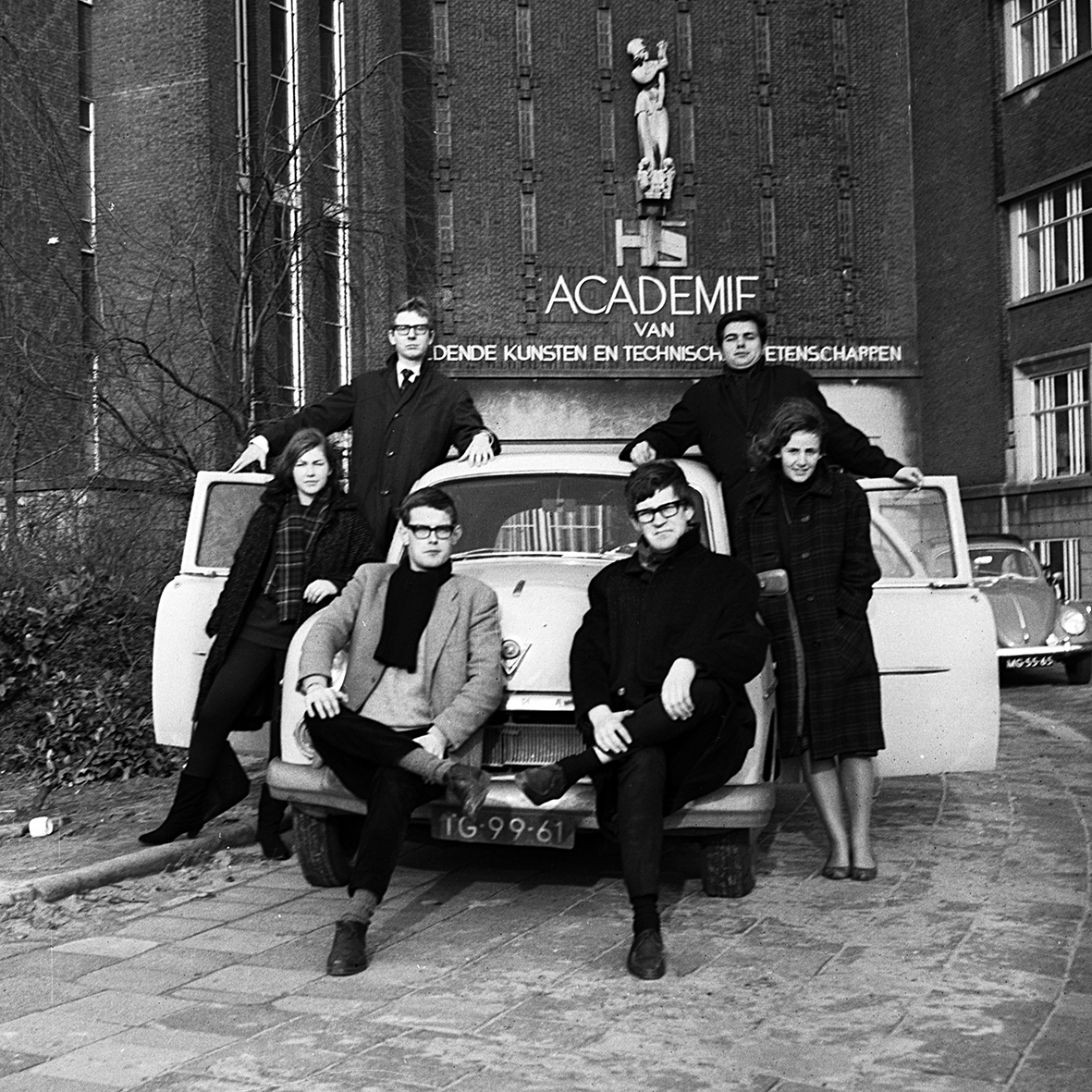
Academie van Beeldende Kunsten en Technische Wetenschappen, ca. 1965.

In 1781, the drawing society was turned into a public academy: the Rotterdamse Academie. In addition to earlier programmes, there were now classes in engineering, perspective theory, anatomy and art philosophy. The academy also kept acting as a meeting place for discussion with 303 members in 1808, while at the education counted 45 pupils. In 1822 the academy was renamed Stadstekenschool voor de Bouwkunde, and in 1832 renamed to Volksindustrieschool.

In 1851 the Academie van Beeldende Kunsten en Technische Wetenschappen was founded from the merger of the Rotterdamse Tekengenootschap and the Rotterdamse Industrieschool. It was located in a building at the Coolvest, now Coolsingel, and headed by Jan Hendrik van de Laar (1807–1874). The school had two divisions, namely division A, where the arts classes were taught, and division B, which was technically oriented.

In 1970 the school was renamed Academie van Beeldende Kunsten, and finally Willem de Kooning Academie in 1998.

== Programs ==
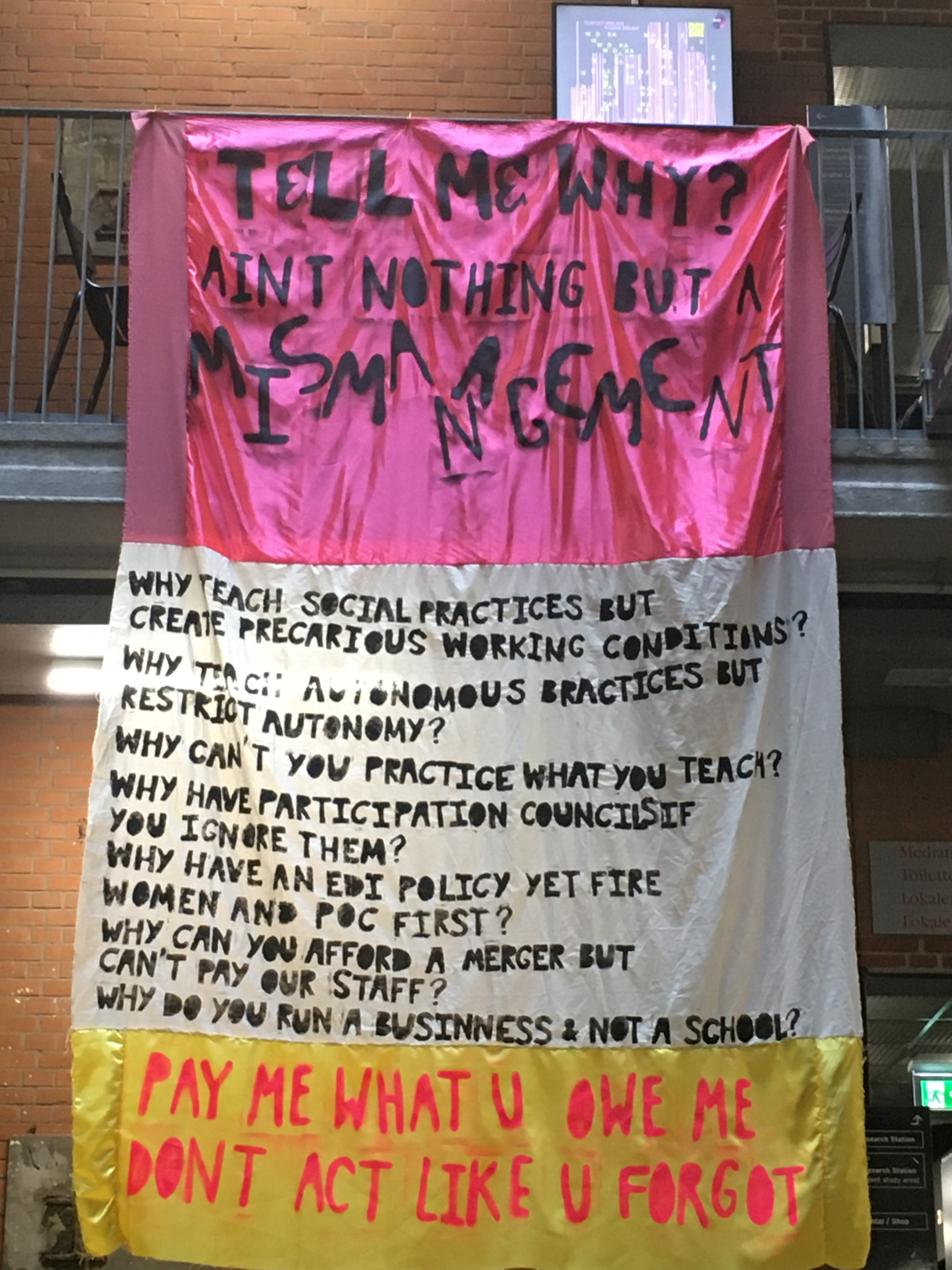
Though students are able to choose from a range of progressive and critical practices, they also object precarity of their tutors and management failures.

The Willem de Kooning Academy offers 13 full-time majors and 1 part-time major programme, leading to a bachelor's degree. The programmes are: Fine Art, Photography, Advertising, Animation, Audiovisual Design, Graphic Design, Illustration, Lifestyle Transformation Design, Fashion Design, Product Design, Spatial Design and Fine Art & Design Teacher Training (full-time and part-time).

The academy also offers a Double Degree programme titled RASL in conjunction with the Eramus University Rotterdam (EUR).

On top of a major, students are able to choose from a wide variety elective minors. It will introduce them to the three graduation profiles: Autonomous Practices, Social Practices and Commercial Practices.

As of present there is also an honours programme for students seeking further development within theory and practice.

The Piet Zwart Institute consist of 4 full-time postgraduate programmes leading to master's degree: Design, Fine Art, Interior Architecture: Research + Design, Media Design (Experimental Publishing & Lens-Based) and Education in Arts. The institute is highly selective with each of the programmes, only admitting 10 to 12 students annually.

== Location ==
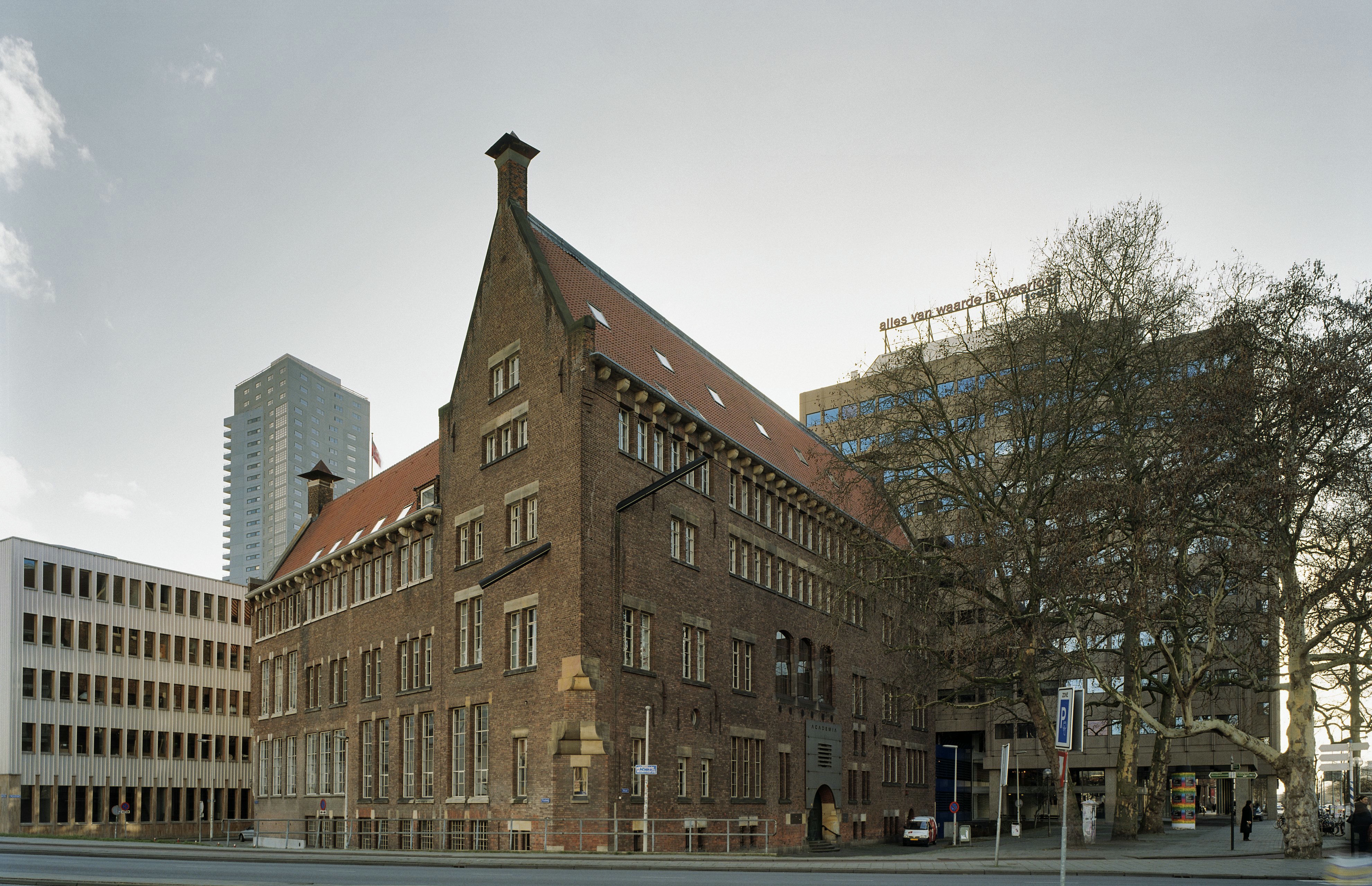
Willem de Kooning Academy building with adherent building (on the left).

The Willem de Kooning Academy is located at Blaak 10 and Wijnhaven 61, two adherent buildings connected with an airbridge. Blaak 10 has always been regarded as the "home base" of the academy. Due to expansion and increase of students enrolling, the adherent Rotterdam University of Applied Sciences' building behind Wijnhaven 61 became entirely occupied by the academy in September 2007. In addition, the already existing programme Leisure Management moved to the academy campus.

Over the past few years, the academy has completely transformed to align with its renewed curriculum. Education is now organized around state-of-the-art stations that serve as shared spaces for learning, collaboration, and experimentation. Rather than belonging to any particular major, minor, or practice, these stations bring together students and teachers from different disciplines and academic years.

Each station provides access to the expertise, facilities, and resources, including both hardware and software, needed to support students’ work. The academy offers seven stations: Interaction Station, Image & Sound Station, Publication Station, Material Station, Drawing Station, Business Station, and Research Station.

== Young talent ==
(Former) students participate in a wide variety of national and international contests, initiatives and programmes. Here is an incomplete overview: SpinAwards Young Talent Show, North Sea Jazz Art Poster Competition, Creative Press Challenge, Dutch Design Awards, Maaskantprijs, Onderzoeksprijs, Steenbergen Stipendium, Drempelprijzen, HEMA ontwerpwedstrijd, BAD Award, Henri Winkelman Award, Woolmark Prize, One Show, VEED Awards, YoungGuns International Award, Volkskrantprijs, Kunstprijs Binnenmaas, Art Rotterdam, Stimuleringsprijs DBKV and Best in Show Award.

== Notable alumni ==
- Per Abramsen (1941–2018)
- Woody van Amen (1936)
- Boris van Berkum (1968)
- Henk de Bouter (1968)
- Machiel Brandenburg (1907–1984)
- Agnes Canta (1888–1964)
- Hendrik Chabot (1894–1949)
- Wim Chabot (1907–1977)
- Simone Dettmeijer (1944–2014)
- Dora Dolz (1971)
- Kees van Dongen (1877–1968)
- Frans van Eijk (1938–2014)
- Ron van der Ende (1965)
- Mathieu Ficheroux (1926-2003)
- Wout van Heusden (1896–1982)
- Willem Hussem (1900–1974)
- Teun Jacob (1927-2009)
- Willem de Kooning (1904–1997)
- Philip Kouwen (1922–2002)
- Cor Kraat (1946)
- Marie Henry Mackenzie (1878-1961)
- Herman Mees (1880–1964)
- Joep van Lieshout (1963)
- Ton van Os (1941)
- Don Satijn (1953)
- Han Schuil (1958)
- Flor Silvester (1923–2008)
- Frans van Straaten (1963)
- Piet van Stuivenberg (1901–1988)
- Kees Torn (1967)
- Bik Van Der Pol (1959/1961)
- Petrus van der Velden (1837–1913)
- Willem van Veldhuizen (1954)
- August Willem van Voorden (1881–1921)
- Anton Vrede (1953)
- Fiep Westendorp (1916–2004)
- Piet Zwart (1885–1977)
