= Don Satijn =

Dutch musician and artist

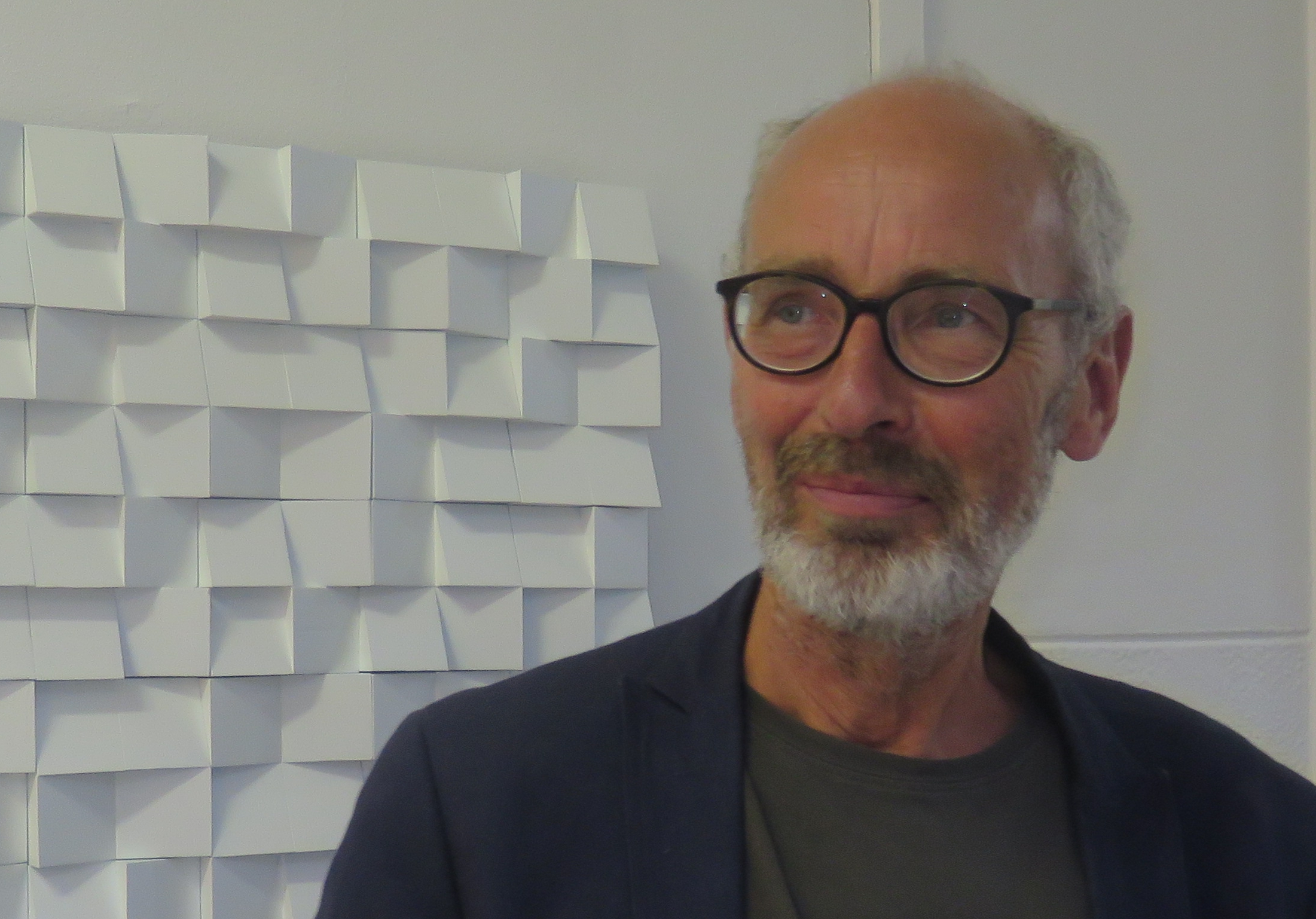
- Don Satijn, 2018.
- Born: 11 May 1953 (age 72); Maastricht, Netherlands
- Education: Willem de Kooning Academy
- Known for: Sculpture

Don Satijn (born 11 May 1953) is a Dutch musician and artist, lecturer at the Codarts, who works as a sculptor and installation artist.

== Biography ==
Born in Maastricht, Satijn grew up in Rotterdam. He started his studies in Delft, and in 1972 moved to study at Codarts in Rotterdam, where in 1977 he obtained his BA in music and composition. From 1988 to 1992 he studied sculpture and fine art at the Willem de Kooning Academy.

During his studies at Codarts Satijn started as teacher, and kept serving at the institute until 2010. Over the years he lectured in music history, music analysis, rhythm, media technique and concept development. In 1980 he also settled as independent visual artist in Rotterdam. From 1992 to 2001 he has also been exhibition designer at CODART. In 2000 he moved to Blanchefosse-et-Bay, a commune in the Ardennes department in northern France, where he is founding director of the Atelier Blanchefosse, centre for the arts and retreat.

In 2008 he became one of the founding members of Apes container, an artists-led cooperative and a platform for transdisciplinary collaboration.

== Work ==
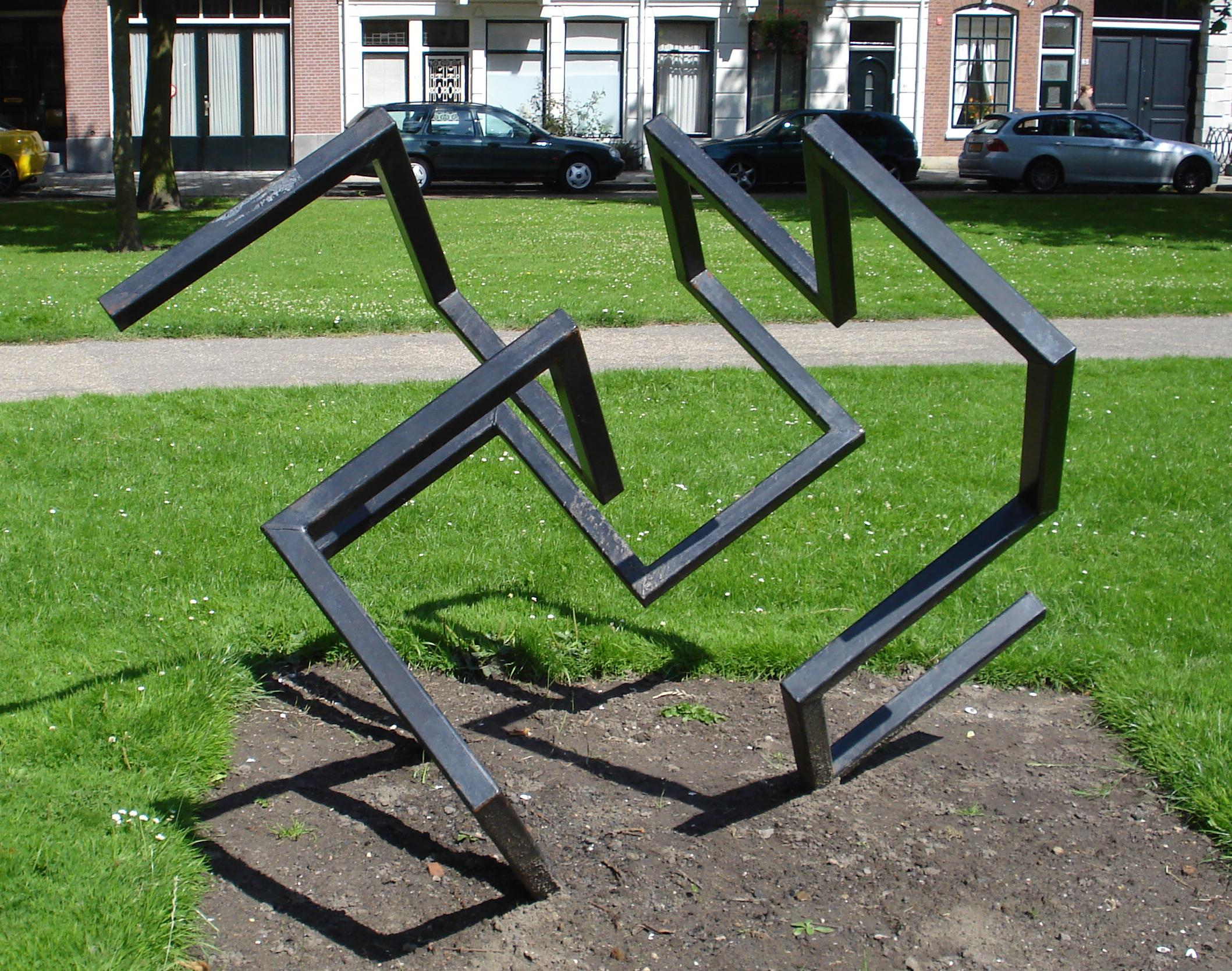
Lines XXII, Plantage, Schiedam 2009.

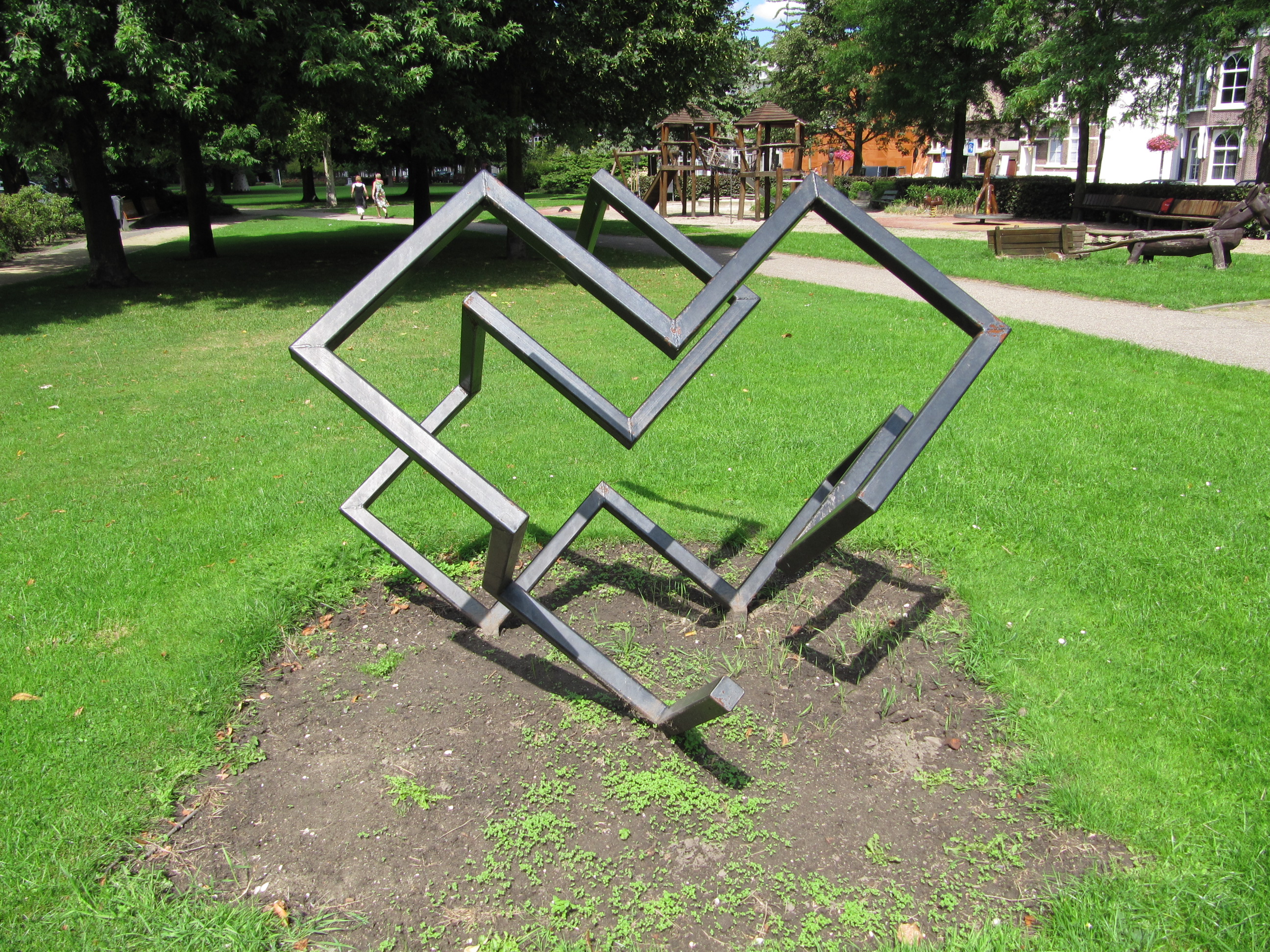
Schiedam sculpture in 2010.

As visual artist Satijn has realized a series of performances, sculptor, and installations. His main theme is the geometric constructions of lines and squares. Satijn (2015) explains:

Since 1980 I'm working on long duration projects all based on squares and cubes. Main goal is to get hold on infinity........ In very simple structural combinations I find billions of possibilities. For me this is a metaphore for infinity. "If in nothing (a choice for black or white; material or non-material) already we can find endless amounts of possibilities, how complex then is the universe, and how humble we should be."

In the early 1990s he developed all this works towards the concept of The Stone Company, with and exhibition of the work in the RAM gallery in 1995. About his working process of Rutger van Houten explained that this "process that takes place between idea and object may be described as an intuitive system, guided by a love and fascination for variation options and harmony." And more in general about his labour:

The first thing that strikes one about Don Satijn’s works are their stark austerity and apparent simplicity. All his creations, however, are the result of a labour-intensive process. A process in which rules apply that the artist has set himself, conditions the works must eventually meet. He follows a binary system, by which a space is there or it isn’t, it is filled in, or it is open. Within the limits of his own rules he explores possible variations by means of this system. Thus he undertakes a quest for variation options from one single starting point. He is especially fascinated by the scale the number of options takes on, sometimes bordering upon the infinite. By losing himself in his explorations Satijn tries to point us to the infinity and elusiveness of the surrounding cosmos. For him the process of construction is at least as important as the final work of art.

In 2010 Satijn developed the catalogue, entitled Don Satijn 1990 - 2010, which contained an overview of two decades of this sculptures and installations.

== Exhibitions, a selection ==
Over the year Satijn exhibited his work from many cities in the Netherlands, in Germany and France.

- 1994: Group exhibition:‘The Stone Company’, Galerie Rüster, Frankfurt, Germany
- 1995: Solo "The Stone Company II," RAM Galerie Rotterdam
- 2010: Solo exhibition, Galerie 300%, Rotterdam
- 2011: Group summer exhibition, Gallery Nine (9) Amsterdam
- 2012: Group exhibition, Gorcums Museum
