= Machiel Brandenburg =

Dutch painter and drawing artist

Machiel Brandenburg (4 May 1907 in Rotterdam – 30 May 1984 in Cape Town) was a painter and drawing artist.

Brandenburg studied until 1929 at the Academie van Beeldende Kunsten en Technische Wetenschappen, now the Willem de Kooning Academy. He worked in the Netherlands, initially in Rotterdam (1933) and thereafter in Hilversum.

He married Christina Maria Klijn in April 1941 and had three children, namely Marianne (born January 16, 1942), Jan (born January 10, 1944) and Hannelore (born June 4, 1947).

In April 1953 he emigrated to Cape Town, South Africa. In South Africa he taught art at the Jan van Riebeeck High School and Tygerberg High School, both in Cape Town as well as the Michaelis School of Fine Art
