= August Willem van Voorden =

Dutch painter

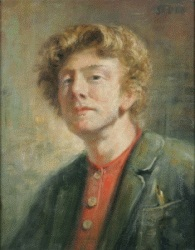
Self-portrait (c.1910)

August Willem van Voorden (25 November 1881, Rotterdam - 2 October 1921, Rotterdam) was a Dutch painter, best known for scenes of urban life in his hometown.

== Biography ==
His father was a decorative house painter and gave him his first lessons. His first formal studies were at the Academy of Visual Arts. Later, he took lessons from Alexander van Maasdijk and Jan de Jong. He spent most of his life in Rotterdam, where he had a studio on the grounds of the Woudestein Estate (now part of Erasmus University). In 1908, he lived briefly in Kortenhoef, where he met his wife, and from 1912 to 1913 he was in Nieuw-Loosdrecht.

He initially worked as a decorative painter, like his father, but after 1903 began doing regular oils and watercolors depicting street scenes, filled with the daily activities of ordinary people. He was heavily influenced by the works of George Hendrik Breitner and was often referred to as the "Breitner of Rotterdam".

He worked during a period of rapid growth and was able to document the process, choosing bright, impressionistic colors as a counterweight to the gray hues normally associated with Dutch cityscapes. He also painted landscapes near Kortenhoef and Laren, where he worked with artists of the Hague School, as well as some portraits and still-lifes. For many years, he was a member of Arti et Amicitiae and the Haagse Kunstkring. He died of undisclosed causes just short of his fortieth birthday.

== Selected paintings ==
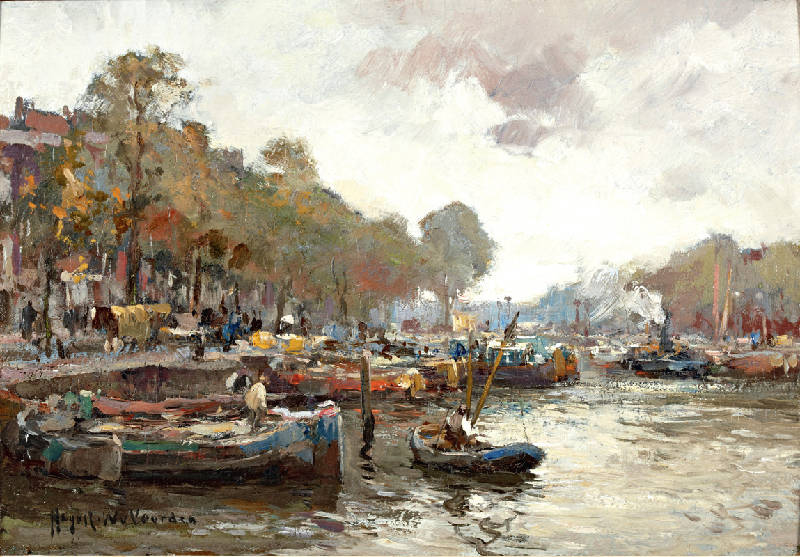
Moored Boats along the Boompjes

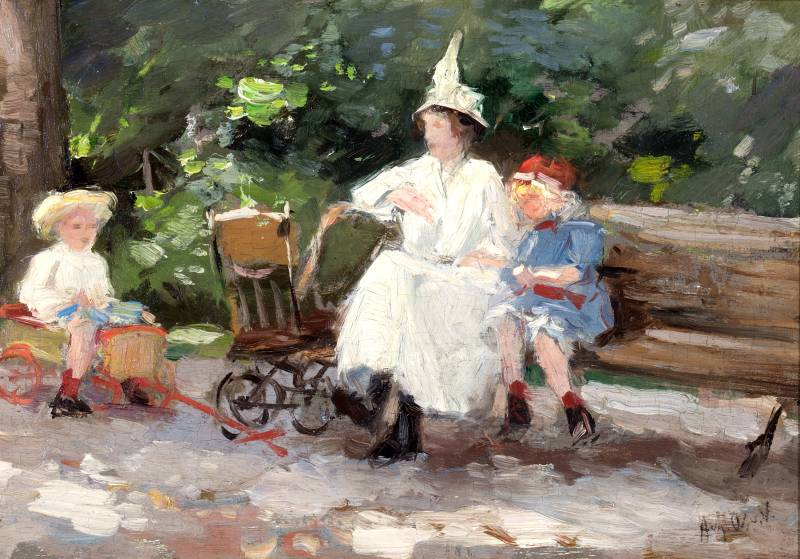
Mother and Children in the Kralingen Woods

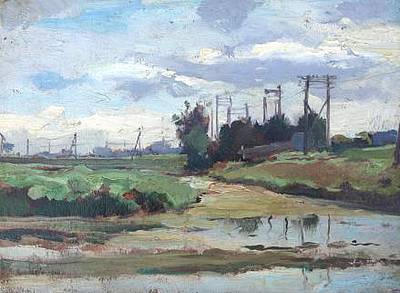
Landscape

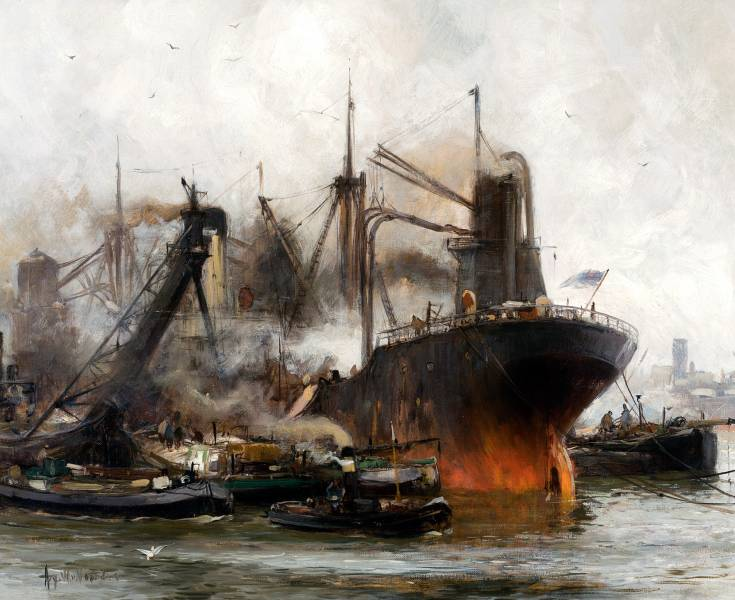
Coal Conveyor
