= Blanchefosse-et-Bay =

- Commune
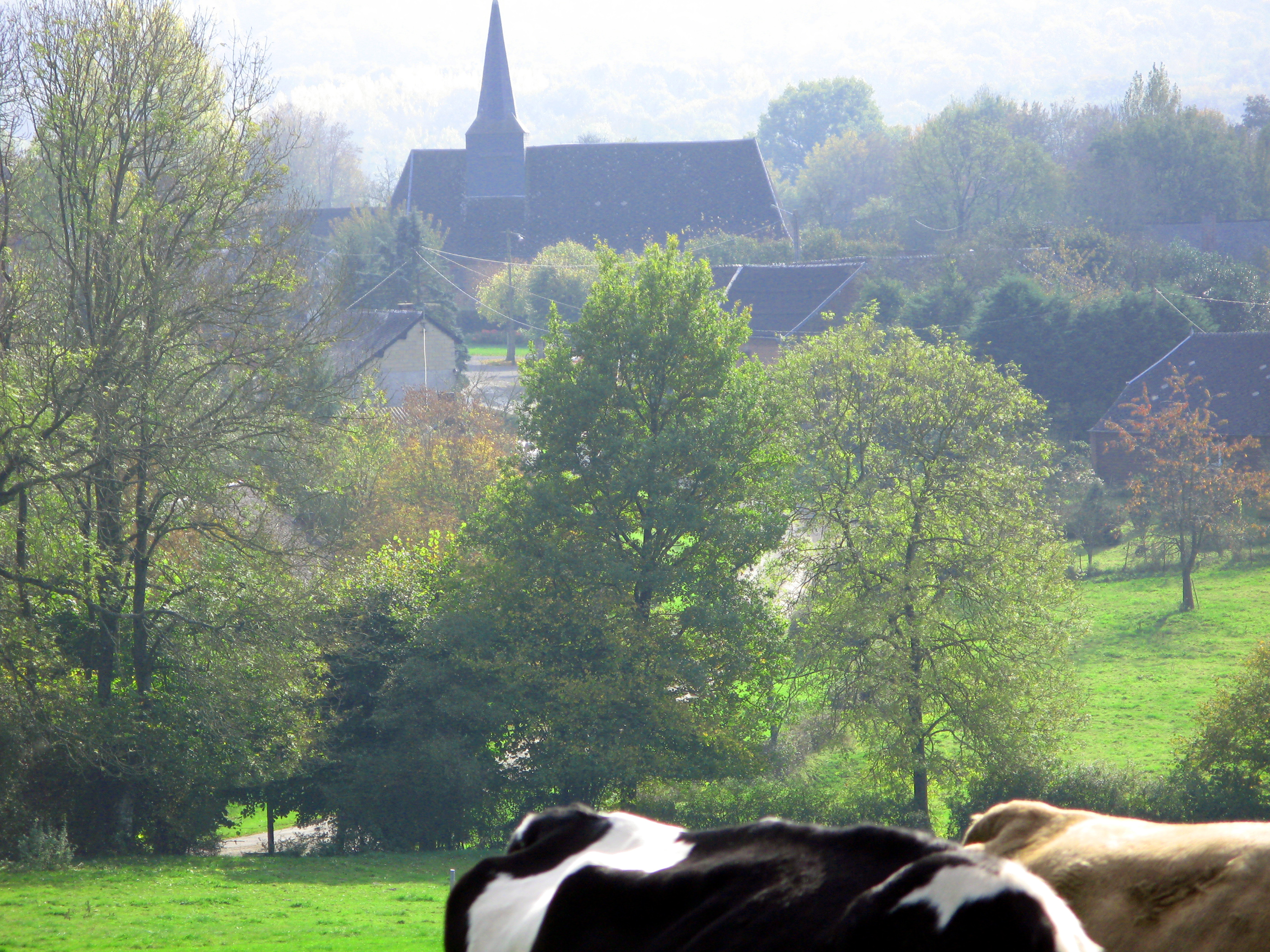
- A general view of Bay

- Coat of arms
- Location of Blanchefosse-et-Bay
- Location within France Location within Grand Est
- Coordinates: 49°46′41″N 4°14′12″E
- Country: France
- Region: Grand Est
- Department: Ardennes
- Arrondissement: Charleville-Mézières
- Canton: Signy-l'Abbaye
- Intercommunality: Ardennes Thiérache

Government
  - Mayor (2020–2026): Romuald Petit
- Area^{1}: 20.47 km^{2} (7.90 sq mi)
- Elevation: 255 m (837 ft)
- Highest elevation: 278 m (912 ft)
- Lowest elevation: 170 m (560 ft)
- Population (2023): 133
  - Density: 6.50/km^{2} (16.8/sq mi)
- Time zone: UTC+01:00 (CET)
  - Summer (DST): UTC+02:00 (CEST)
- INSEE/Postal code: 08069 /08290
- ^{1} French Land Register data, which excludes lakes, ponds, glaciers > 1 km^{2} (0.386 sq mi or 247 acres) and river estuaries.

Blanchefosse-et-Bay (French pronunciation: [blɑ̃ʃfos e bɛ]) is a commune in the Ardennes department and Grand Est region of north-eastern France. It was created in 1974 by the merger of two former communes: Blanchefosse and Bay.

== Population ==
Historical population
Year	Pop.	±% p.a.
1968	334	—
1975	261	−3.46%
1982	210	−3.06%
1990	184	−1.64%
1999	152	−2.10%
2007	154	+0.16%
2012	158	+0.51%
2017	151	−0.90%
2023	133	−2.09%
Source: INSEE

== See also ==
- Communes of the Ardennes department
