= Kees Torn =

Dutch text writer and comedy performer (born 1967)

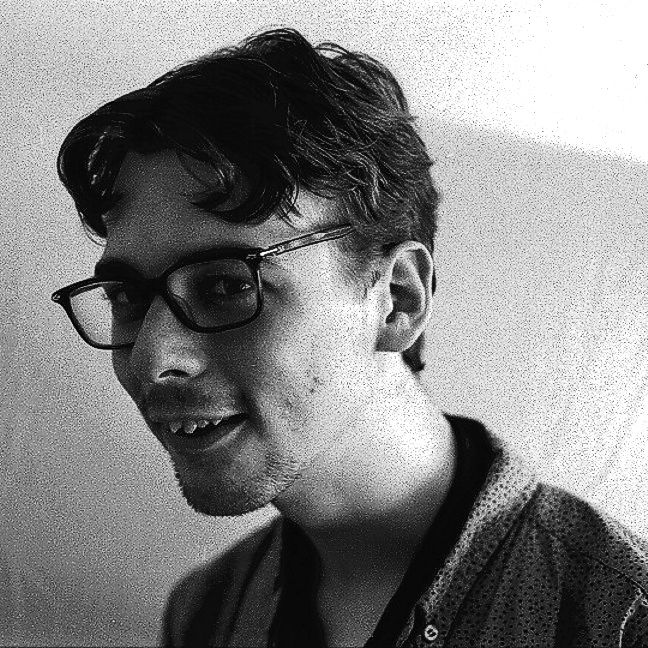
Kees Torn, 1991

Kees Torn (born 1967 in Oostburg) is a Dutch text writer and comedy performer.

== Career ==
Torn started his cabaret performance in 1991, when he was studying at the Willem de Kooning Academy in Rotterdam. As "Kees en Ik" (Kees and I), he performed quite a successful show with fellow student Gerrie Hondius. In 1994 he made his official solo-debut with the show "Laat maar laaien". Torn is known for his old fashioned style of comedy performance, which consists largely of songs and poems. Torn prefers to write about whisky, cigars and love.

== Prizes and nominations ==
- 1991: "Groningen Studentencabaret Festival": personality prize (Kees & Ik)
- 1994: "Leids Cabaret Festival": jury- and audience-prize
- 1996: "Werftheaterprijs"
- 1997: Conamus-supportprize
- 1999: Annie M.G. Schmidtprize
- 2005: Nominated for "Neerlands Hoop"
- 2007: Won VSCD Poelifinario 2006-2007

== Shows ==
- 1995: Laat maar laaien
- 1996: Als ik het niet dacht
- 1998: Plek Zat (Room enough)
- 2001: Mooie boel (Nice mess)
- 2002: In de gloria
- 2004: Doe mee en win
- 2006: Dood en verderf (Death and destruction)
- 2009: Einde verhaal (End of story)
- 2010-2011: Loze kreten
- 2016: Eraf met dat dak
