= Woody van Amen =

Dutch artist

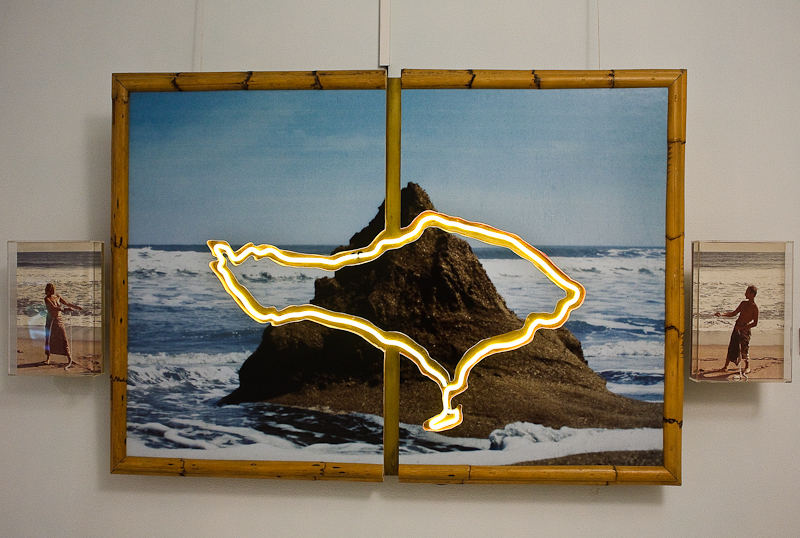
Mata Hari by Woody van Amen, 1978, neon light, bamboo, perspex photo of the Matterhorn with bamboo neon frame with photos at the sides behind perspex.

Wilhelmus Josephus (Woody) van Amen (Eindhoven August 26, 1936) is a Dutch sculptor, painter and collage artist.

== Education ==
Van Amen studied at the Rotterdam Academy. His teachers included Louis van Roode. From 1970 he taught at the same academy. In 1959 he made the longest paintings in the world, which were abstract paintings made on organ books.

== Pop Art ==
From 1961 he spent two years in the United States. He was introduced to the work of American artists such as Andy Warhol and Robert Rauschenberg, pioneers in the pop art movement. These artists used everyday consumer objects in their work. Van Amen drew inspiration from this approach and made a number of paintings in which he incorporated familiar brands from the Netherlands.

Back in the Netherlands, he developed his own style and at one point moved on to using other techniques. He devoted himself to assemblage art. He made his works from a variety of objects taken from everyday life. He created art that was intended to shock the establishment. For example, his work Electric Chair from 1964 was an assemblage piece made of waste wood and had everything necessary for the execution of the death sentence. At the same time it looks clumsy and too cozy with a flower pot full of geraniums. The public reaction to the work was negative and the work was not regarded as art but as mockery. The work was rejected for an exhibition in Schiedam.

== After Pop Art ==
The period 1966-1967 saw a change in the themes prevalent in Woody van Amen's work. The new work involved a study of the visual aspects of movement, light and light reflection. The artist also started to experiment with new materials such as perspex and neon.

In 1968 Woody van Amen started to experiment with ice. He took a freezer apart and reassembled it inside out. A beautiful coat of white frost formed on the modified shape of the cooling element.

Woody van Amen also made a series of "Vibro-objects" intended as an ironic take on consumer society. He modified the weight loss devices of that time so that they were completely deprived of their function and became components of large torture instruments made of cold chrome. The steel springs that were attached to the devices vibrated so that the whole resembled fat western bodies that were trembling and shivering.

== Later evolution of his work ==
In the 1970s he started to make frequent trips to Switzerland and Southeast Asia, which is the basis of an oriental influence in his work. His art moved away from pop art and became difficult to classify. He started using a few recurring forms in his works such as the Matterhorn and a form he refers to as the taxat, which is based on an Oriental symbol.

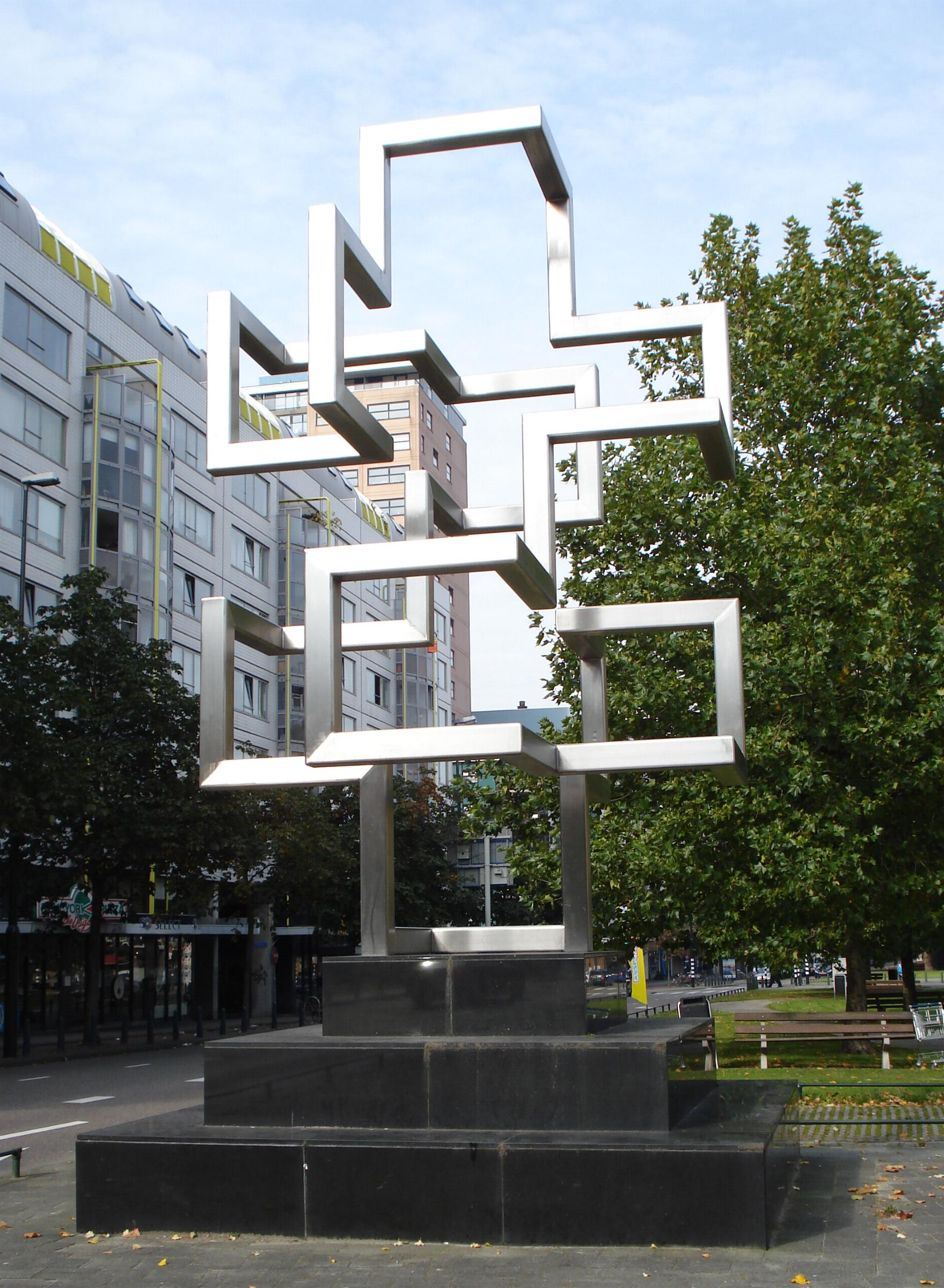
Taxat by Woody van Amen in Rotterdam, The Netherlands.

In 1993 he was the recipient of the Chabot Prize which is awarded by the Prins Bernhard Cultuurfonds (Prince Bernhard Culture Fund). Museum Valkhof organised in 2003 a retrospective of his work and a catalogue raisonné of his work was published.

After recovering from a serious illness, he visited Singapore in 2003 where he came upon flashcards of Chinese characters. Chinese characters, particularly the characters shuangxi or "double happiness" (喜喜) (usually associated with Chinese weddings), have since played an important role in his work.

In 2007, van Amen made the film Sources of Inspiration. It records his travels to Vietnam, Burma and Indonesia. Man, religion and the beauty of nature play an important role in the film. Rotterdam based art centre Tent organised the large duo exhibition New Romantic Spirit of van Amen and the Dutch artist Hidde van Schie.

== See also ==
- List of Dutch painters
