= Ton van Os =

Dutch artist

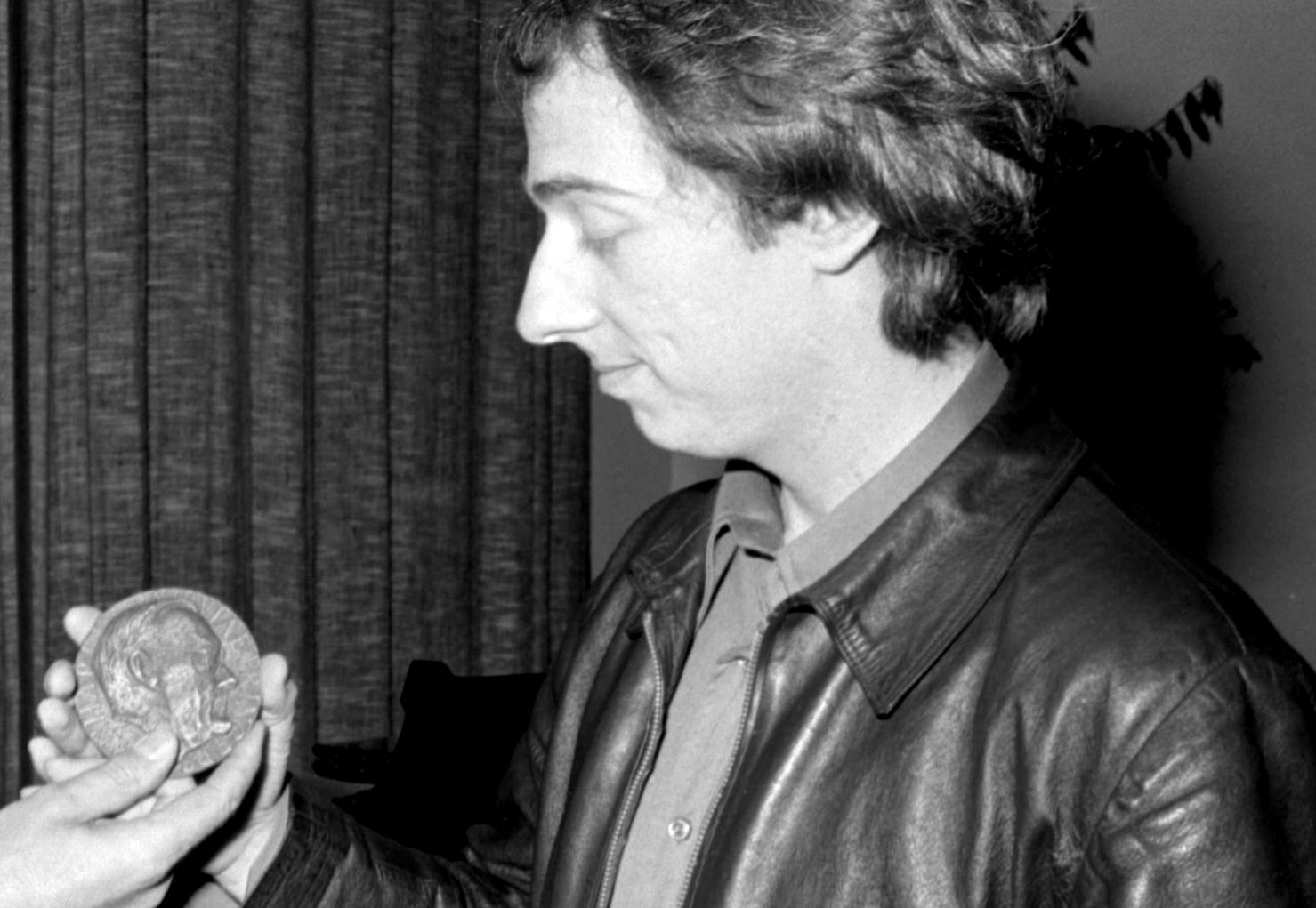
Ton van Os, 1974

Anthonius Petrus (Ton) van Os (born 2 March 1941) is a Dutch artist who works as etcher, monumental artist, graphic artist, wall painter, painter and mosaicist.

Born in Rotterdam, Van Os studied at the Academie voor Beeldende Kunsten (now Willem de Kooning Academy) from 1958 to 1962. After graduation, he settled as independent artist in Rotterdam. From 1994 to 2001 he was lecturer at the ArtEZ Institute of the Arts in Arnhem.

Van Os started his graphic works in the 1960s with people or groups of people as theme. In the 1970s his work became more abstract and he started to visualize shadings. In the 1970s he started to receive international attention for his work. Van Os was awarded the Award on the Threshold prize by the City of Rotterdam in 1962, and the Hendrik Chabot Award in 1974.

== Selected publications ==
- Trudy Drescher, Ton van Os, Rotterdamse Kunststichting, 19 Dec. '69-12 Jan. '70, Rotterdamse Kunststichting, 1969.
- Ton van Os (1980), Veertig etsen: 1972-1974.
- Ton van Os, Het werk van Ton van Os, 1986.
- Ton van Os: schilderijen/paintings, 1987-1989, 1988.
- Ton van Os (2011), Steven Aalders en Ton van Os: 'For Philip Guston'.
