= Rotterdam University of Applied Sciences =

University in Rotterdam, Netherlands

- Hogeschool Rotterdam
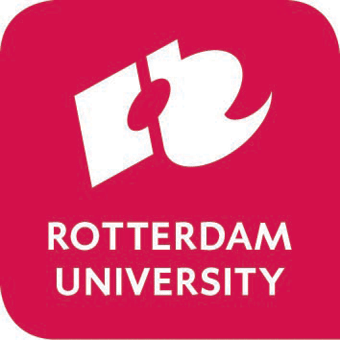
- Motto: Overtref jezelf
- Type: Public, University of Applied Sciences
- Established: 1988; 38 years ago
- Administrative staff: 4000
- Students: 39,000
- Location: Rotterdam, Netherlands
- Colours: HR Red, blue, yellow & white
- Website: rotterdamuas.com

The Rotterdam University of Applied Sciences (abbreviated as: RUAS; Dutch: Hogeschool Rotterdam) is a large vocational university located in Rotterdam, Netherlands. It was created in 1988 by a large-scale merger of 19 higher education schools followed by a merger with the Hogeschool voor Economische Studies. It teaches at ten campuses in Rotterdam and one in the nearby city of Dordrecht. Its current student body is around 39,000.

== Locations ==
Rotterdam University of Applied Sciences is spread over several locations, namely:

- Main location (Museumpark): The university's main location is a building complex consisting of two parts: the high-rise building, where the actual main entrance is located opposite the Dijkzigt metro station, and the low-rise building, where the formal main entrance is located, on Museumpark. The complex was the headquarters of the food manufacturer Unilever until its relocation to Weena in 1993. Many traces of this can still be found, especially in the low-rise building. Well-known examples include the staircase designed by Gispen in 1930.
