= Kraan (disambiguation) =

Kraan is a German band based in Ulm and formed in 1970.

== People with surname ==
- Axel van der Kraan
- Eric Kraan
- Gerda Kraan
- Greetje Kraan
- Helena van der Kraan

== See also ==
- Krahn (disambiguation)
- Kran (disambiguation)
