= Helena van der Kraan =

Czechoslovak-born Dutch photographer and partner (1940–2020)

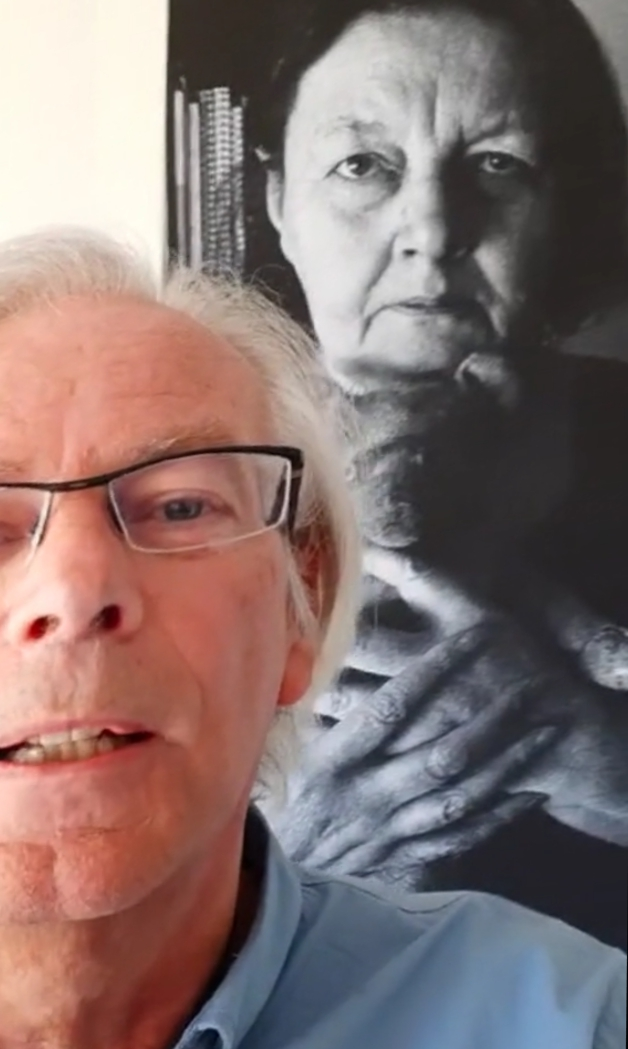
- Wim van Sinderen and Helena van der Kraan (in the picture in the back), Livetour Fotomuseum Den Haag, 2020
- Born: Helena Jirina Mazl; 14 June 1940; Prague, Protectorate of Bohemia and Moravia
- Died: 14 June 2020 (aged 80); Rotterdam, Netherlands
- Known for: Photography
- Notable work: Bear and Teddy project
- Movement: Realism
- Partner: Axel van der Kraan
- Awards: Hendrik Chabot Award, 1989

Helena van der Kraan-Maazel (born Helena Jirina Mazl; 14 June 1940 – 14 June 2020) was a Czechoslovak-born Dutch photographer and partner in the artist duo Axel en Helena van der Kraan.

== Biography ==
Helena Jirina Maazel was born and raised in Prague in the former Czechoslovakia. She was educated at the Czech Technical University in Prague, where she studied architecture for a few years. She started working as window dresser and designer, and developed herself at night as a painter and graphic artist.

After the Prague Spring she decided to flee. In the Netherlands she continued her studies at Ateliers ’63, where she met her partner for live Axel van der Kraan. Afterwards they continued to work together as the artist duo Axel en Helena van der Kraan. They lived and worked in Rotterdam since 1987. In 1989, they were awarded the Hendrik Chabot Award. In 1990, at the Museum Boymans Van Beuningen, there was a retrospective of their work with sculptures, drawings, and photography.

Helena van der Kraan-Maazel died 14 June 2020 (her 80th birthday) in Rotterdam from cancer. She was described as an artist, who "observed with a concerned look, who recorded her surroundings in noiseless portraits."

== Work ==
=== Axel en Helena van der Kraan ===
The Dutch artist Axel van der Kraan had started as sculptor, and together they continued to make sculptures and installation art. Helena took it upon her to document these art projects in projects in photographs. This evolved into her own photographic art projects involving still life and portraits of people.

=== Series ===
Helena van der Kraan created a number of remarkable series of portraits. In 1986 with the series Medewerkers (Staf Members) she took the picture of eighty employees of the Haags Gemeentemuseum, nowadays Kunstmuseum Den Haag.

In 1995 she pictured the 75 members of the Dutch Senate, the upper house of the States General, the legislature of the Netherlands. In those days the ties where prominent attributes. The Members of the Senate, all with ties in the pictures, often looked a "little nervous."

=== The Artdealers ===
Another of her more famous work was the picture called The Art dealers as Toef Jaeger (2020) describes it:

".... two men at a sink; one looks concentrated at a photo. He is clearly going to take his time, in his casual pose one foot is slightly back. In order not to balance, he leans his shoulder against the wall. The other man awaits judgment on the photo. There is a folder on the sink in front of them. No idea what else is in the folder, but based on the title you expect it to be more photos.

The great thing is not only that two observing men are observed here, but it is also the suggestion that the photo makes. It's about art, but why does it have to be at a washbasin at public toilets? And what is in the photo? If the art has to be exchanged in this way, it is either something that is not for everyone's eyes, or the volatility of selling a work of art has become something that you do right after washing your hands."

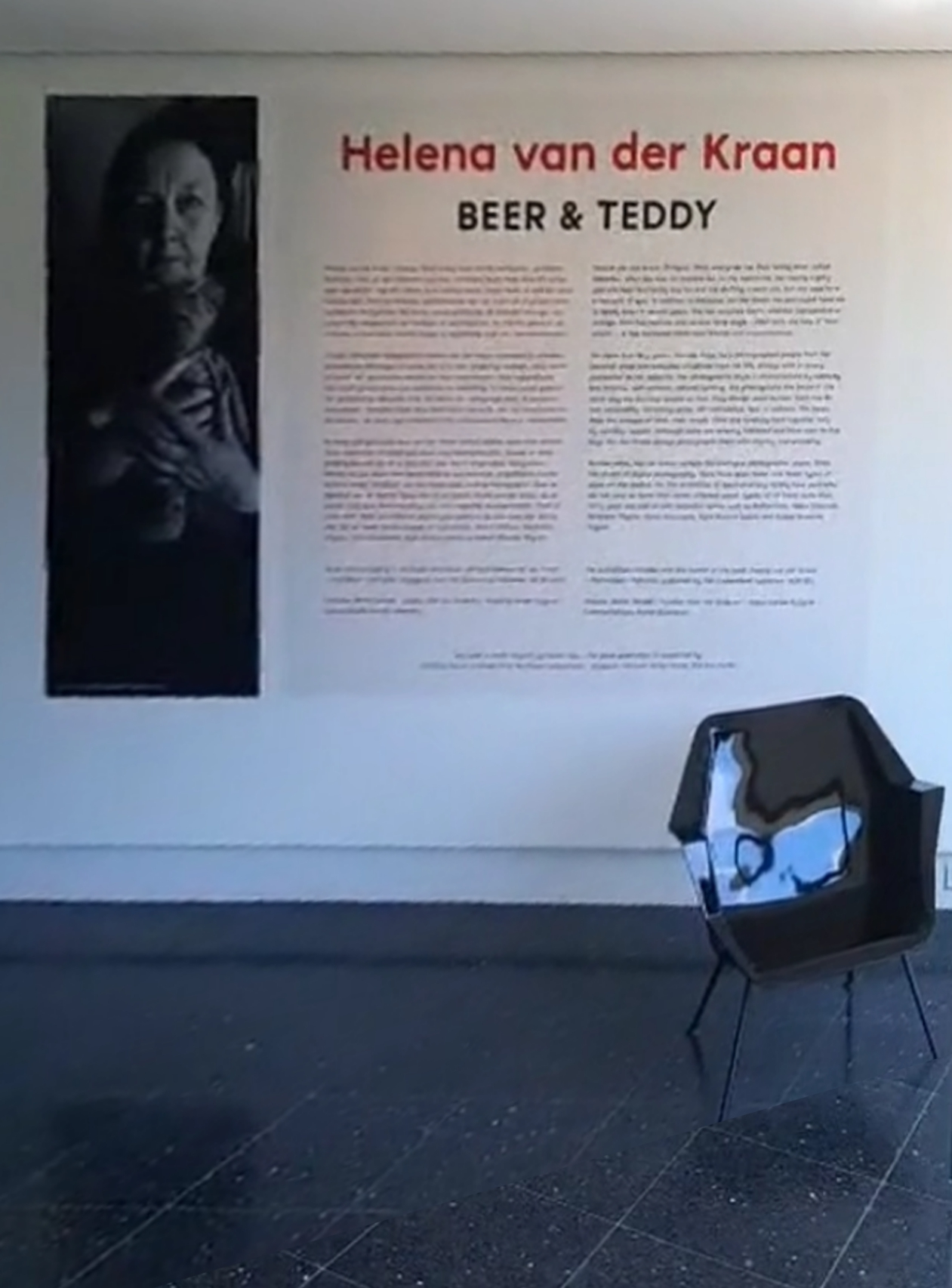
Livetour Fotomuseum, Helena van der Kraan, 2020

=== The Bear and Teddy project ===
In her youth Helena van der Kraan had a special relation with her teddy bear, which at young age she had named Bebbeba. She left him behind when she fled, but was reunited later on.

Later on in life she started photographing teddy bears similar to the way she had portrayed people. Over the years she photographed over two hundred teddy bears, who sometimes "appear proud and self-assured, sometimes fearful and melancholy, but they are always dignified." The teddy bears were often portrayed naked, sometimes wearing a worn jacket.

== Exhibitions, a selection ==
- 1985. La Grande Parade, Stedelijk Museum Amsterdam.
- 1986. Bezielde fotografie, Haagse Gemeentemuseum.
- 1996. Helena van der Kraan: Museum Boijmans Van Beuningen.
- 2005. Fotomuseum Den Haag.
- 2020. Bear and Teddy, Fotomuseum Den Haag

== Publications ==
- Helena van der Kraan, Kees Broos, Van der Kraan, Gemeentemuseum Den Haag, 1978.
- L. W. H. Dijk. Helena van der Kraan: Museum Boijmans.' Museum Boijmans Van Beuningen, 1996.
- Wim van Sinderen (ed.), Donald Mader (transl.) Helena van der Kraan. The Hague Museum of Photography, Den Haag : Terra, 2005. ISBN 90-5897-373-5.
- Helena van der Kraan. Portretten/Portraits, Van Zoetendaal Publishers, 2020. ISBN 978-90-72532-43-5.
