= Krahn (disambiguation) =

The Krahn people is an ethnic group of Liberia and Ivory Coast.

Krahn may also refer to

- Krahn language (disambiguation), several related languages spoken by the Krahn people
- Annike Krahn (born 1985), German footballer
- Betina Krahn (active from 1983), American writer of historical romance novels
- Brent Krahn (born 1982), Canadian former professional ice hockey goaltender
- Edgar Krahn (1894–1961), Estonian mathematician
- Elijah Krahn (born 2003), German footballer
- Fernando Krahn (1935–2010), Chilean cartoonist and plastic artist
- Johannes Krahn (1908–1974), German architect and academic teacher
- Maria Krahn (1896–1977), German actress

== See also ==
- Rayleigh–Faber–Krahn inequality, in spectral geometry
- Kraan (disambiguation)
- Kran (disambiguation)
