= Symmetric decreasing rearrangement =

Type of mathematical function

In mathematics, the symmetric decreasing rearrangement of a function is a function which is symmetric and decreasing, and whose level sets are of the same size as those of the original function.

== Definition for sets ==
Given a measurable set, $A,$ in $\R^n,$ one defines the symmetric rearrangement of $A,$ called $A^*,$ as the ball centered at the origin, whose volume (Lebesgue measure) is the same as that of the set $A.$

An equivalent definition is
$$A^* = \left\{x \in \R^n :\,\omega_n\cdot|x|^n < |A|\right\},$$
where $\omega_n$ is the volume of the unit ball and where $|A|$ is the volume of $A.$

== Definition for functions ==
The rearrangement of a non-negative, measurable real-valued function $f$ whose level sets $f^{-1}(y)$ (for $y \in \R_{\geq 0}$) have finite measure is
$$f^*(x) = \int_0^\infty \mathbb{I}_{\{y: f(y)>t\}^*}(x) \, dt,$$
where $\mathbb{I}_A$ denotes the indicator function of the set $A.$ In words, the value of $f^*(x)$ gives the height $t$ for which the radius of the symmetric rearrangement of $\{y: f(y) > t\}$ is equal to $x.$ We have the following motivation for this definition. Because the identity
$$g(x) = \int_0^\infty \mathbb{I}_{\{y: g(y)>t\}}(x) \, dt,$$
holds for any non-negative function $g,$ the above definition is the unique definition that forces the identity $\mathbb{I}_{A}^* = \mathbb{I}_{A^*}$ to hold.

== Properties ==
Function and its symmetric decreasing rearrangement preserve the measure of level sets.

The function $f^*$ is a symmetric and decreasing function whose level sets have the same measure as the level sets of $f,$ that is,
$$|\{x: f^*(x)>t\}| = |\{x: f(x)>t\}|.$$

If $f$ is a function in $L^p,$ then
$$\|f\|_{L^p} = \|f^*\|_{L^p}.$$

The Hardy–Littlewood inequality holds, that is,
$$\int fg \leq \int f^* g^*.$$

Further, the Pólya–Szegő inequality holds. This says that if $1 \leq p < \infty$ and if $f \in W^{1,p}$ then
$$\|\nabla f^*\|_p \leq \|\nabla f\|_p.$$

The symmetric decreasing rearrangement is order preserving and decreases $L^p$ distance, that is,
$$f \leq g \text{ implies }  f^* \leq g^*$$
and
$$\|f - g\|_{L^p} \geq \|f^* - g^*\|_{L^p}.$$

== Applications ==
The Pólya–Szegő inequality yields, in the limit case, with $p = 1,$ the isoperimetric inequality. Also, one can use some relations with harmonic functions to prove the Rayleigh–Faber–Krahn inequality.

== Nonsymmetric decreasing rearrangement ==
We can also define $f^*$ as a function on the nonnegative real numbers rather than on all of $\R^n.$ Let $(E, \mu)$ be a σ-finite measure space, and let $f : E\to[-\infty,\infty]$ be a measurable function that takes only finite (that is, real) values μ-a.e. (where "$\mu$-a.e." means except possibly on a set of $\mu$-measure zero). We define the distribution function $\mu_f : [0,\infty]\to[0,\infty]$ by the rule
$$\mu_f(s)=\mu\{x\in E : \vert f(x)\vert >s\}.$$
We can now define the decreasing rearrangment (or, sometimes, nonincreasing rearrangement) of $f$ as the function $f^* : [0,\infty)\to[0,\infty]$ by the rule
$$f^*(t)=\inf\{s\in[0,\infty] : \mu_f(s)\leq t\}.$$
Note that this version of the decreasing rearrangement is not symmetric, as it is only defined on the nonnegative real numbers. However, it inherits many of the same properties listed above as the symmetric version, namely:

- $f$ and $f^*$ are equimeasurable, that is, they have the same distribution function.
- The Hardy-Littlewood inequality holds, that is, $\int_E|fg|\;d\mu\leq\int_0^\infty f^*(t)g^*(t)\;dt.$
- $\vert f\vert\leq\vert g\vert$ $\mu$-a.e. implies $f^*\leq g^*.$
- $(af)^*=|a|f^*$ for all real numbers $a.$
- $(f+g)^*(t_1+t_2) \leq f^*(t_1)+g^*(t_2)$ for all $t_1,t_2\in[0,\infty).$
- $|f_n|\uparrow|f|$ $\mu$-a.e. implies $f_n^*\uparrow f^*.$
- $\left(\vert f\vert^p\right)^*=(f^*)^p$ for all positive real numbers $p.$
- $\|f\|_{L_p(E)}=\|f^*\|_{L_p[0,\infty)}$ for all positive real numbers $p.$
- $\|f\|_{L_\infty(E)}=f^*(0).$

The (nonsymmetric) decreasing rearrangement function arises often in the theory of rearrangement-invariant Banach function spaces. Especially important is the following:

Luxemburg Representation Theorem. Let $\rho$ be a rearrangement-invariant Banach function norm over a resonant measure space $(E, \mu).$ Then there exists a (possibly not unique) rearrangement-invariant function norm $\overline{\rho}$ on $[0,\infty)$ such that $\rho(f)=\overline{\rho}(f^*)$ for all nonnegative measurable functions $f : E \to [0,\infty]$ which are finite-valued $\mu$-a.e.

Note that the definitions of all the terminology in the above theorem (that is, Banach function norms, rearrangement-invariant Banach function spaces, and resonant measure spaces) can be found in sections 1 and 2 of Bennett and Sharpley's book (cf. the references below).

== See also ==
- Isoperimetric inequality – Geometric inequality applicable to any closed curve
- Layer cake representation – Concept in mathematics
- Rayleigh–Faber–Krahn inequality – Geometric Wave Phenomenon
- Riesz rearrangement inequality
- Sobolev space – Vector space of functions in mathematics
- Szegő inequality – Concept in mathematical analysis
