= Axel van der Kraan =

- Born: Axel Erik van der Kraan; 18 April 1949 (age 77); Rotterdam
- Known for: Sculpture
- Partner: Helena van der Kraan
- Awards: Hendrik Chabot Award, 1989

Axel Erik van der Kraan (Rotterdam, 18 April 1949) is a Dutch sculptor, performance artist and graphic artist, also known with Helena van der Kraan as Axel and Helena van der Kraan.

== Life and work ==
Van der Kraan was born and raised in Rotterdam. He studied sculpture and fine art at the Willem de Kooning Academy from 1966 to 1968, and continued his studies at the Ateliers '63 from 1968 tot 1970. Here he met Helena van der Kraan and together they performed as Axel and Helena van der Kraan.

At young age Axel van der Kraan had developed a fascination for technology, which played an important role in his work. In the 1970s he and Helene had started developing sculptures, with moving wooden images of people. This developed into installations in the 1980s build up with scrap material. An other line of his own work was the creation of woodcut prints. They often consisted of artificial world, an oppressive artificial landscape with a lot of technical ingenuity.

In 1989 the artist duo was awarded the Hendrik Chabot Award. In 1990, at the Museum Boymans Van Beuningen, there was a retrospective of their work with sculptures, drawings, and photography.

== Exhibitions, a selection ==
- 1970. Binnen en buiten het kader. Stedelijk Museum Amsterdam.
- 1979. Axel en Helena van der Kraan, Gemeentemuseum in Den Haag.
- 1993. Rotterdam Verwandtschaften Düsseldorf. Kunsthal Rotterdam, 1993

== Publications ==
- De geur van hout" 1996. Catalogue, Gorcums Museum, 1996.
- Rotterdam Verwandtschaften Düsseldorf. Catalogue, Kunsthal Rotterdam, 1993.
- Tuyl, Gijs van e.a. Mit Natur Zu Tun. Catalogue, Amsterdam, 1979
