= Jeanne van Heeswijk =

Dutch visual artist and curator (born 1965)

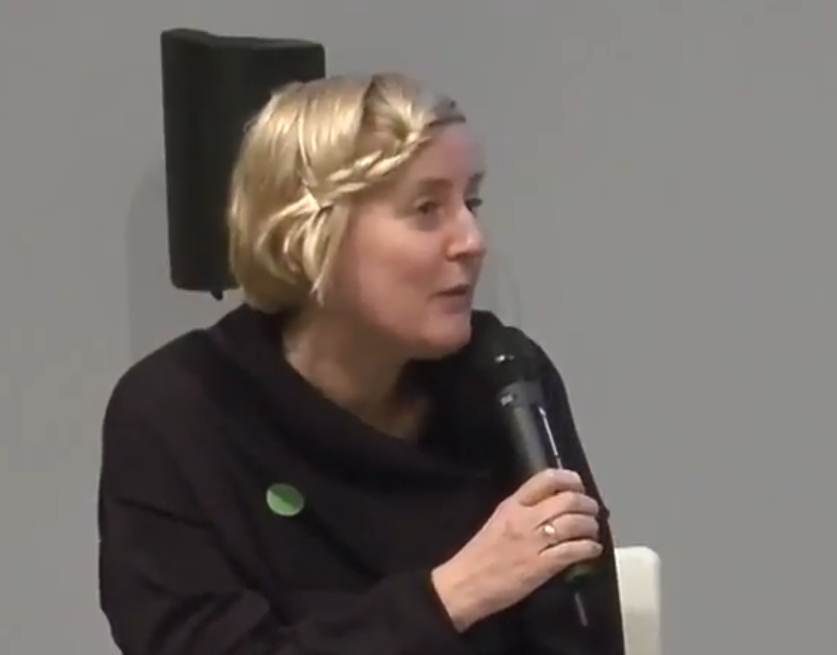
- Jeanne van Heeswijk, 2013.
- Born: Jeanne van Heeswijk; 1965 (age 60–61); Schijndel, The Netherlands
- Known for: visual artist
- Website: www.jeanneworks.net

Jeanne van Heeswijk (born 1965) is a Dutch visual artist and curator. Her work often focuses on social practice art, or the relationship between space, geography and urban renewal. She lives and works in Rotterdam in the Netherlands.

== Biography ==
=== Early life and early career ===
Jeanne van Heeswijk was born in 1965 in Schijndel, The Netherlands. From 1983-1988 she attended the Academie voor Beeldende Vorming in Tilden, The Netherlands. From 1988 to 1990 she attended the Jan Van Eyck Academie in Maastricht, The Netherlands.

In 1996 Manifesta Jeanne van Heeswijk was among the local artists with Bik Van Der Pol and Joep van Lieshout, who were brought into the international scene with the first Manifesta biennale in Rotterdam.

=== Further career ===
In 2003 she was chosen by the curator Rein Wolfs to exhibit at the Dutch Pavilion at the Venice biennale, along with Meschac Gaba, Carlos Amorales, Alicia Framis, and Erik van Lieshout.

In 2005 she created a temporary artwork at the Stedelijk Museum Amsterdam in Amsterdam, entitled Face Your World, which allowed young people to re-imagine and design their surrounding neighborhood. In 2008 she participated in the Seventh Shanghai Biennale, which was themed "Translocalmotion".

In 2010 she was commissioned to create a project for the Liverpool Biennial, which was entitled 2Up 2Down. For this project, van Heeswijk worked with local Liverpool residents to repurpose derelict housing. Van Heeswijk's examination of capital, labor, power, and social injustice through the lens of urban space reflects the way theories of feminist urbanism look at how self-organization, participation, collective ownership, and new forms of sociability create new urban realities.

In 2014 van Heeswijk was awarded the inaugural Keith Haring Fellowship in Art and Activism at Bard College.

Jeanne van Heeswijk is part of the research fellowship program 2018/2019 at BAK, basis voor actuele kunst in Utrecht.

== Recognition ==
- Hendrik Chabot Award, 2002
- Annenberg Prize for Art and Social Change, 2011.
- Curry Stone Design Prize, 2012
