= Kran =

Kran may refer to:

- Kran, Kardzhali Province, a village in Kardzhali Province, Bulgaria
- Kran, Stara Zagora Province, a town in Stara Zagora Province, Bulgaria
- Kran Peninsula, peninsula forming the northeast extremity of Liège Island in the Palmer Archipelago, Antarctica
- Kjell Olav Kran (born 1937), Norwegian business administrator and sports official
- KRAN, radio station in America
- "Kran Turismo", a 2012 song by a Finnish rap duo JVG
- Iranian qiran also known as kran

== See also ==
- Kraan (disambiguation)
- Krahn (disambiguation)
