= Wim van Sinderen =

Dutch journalist

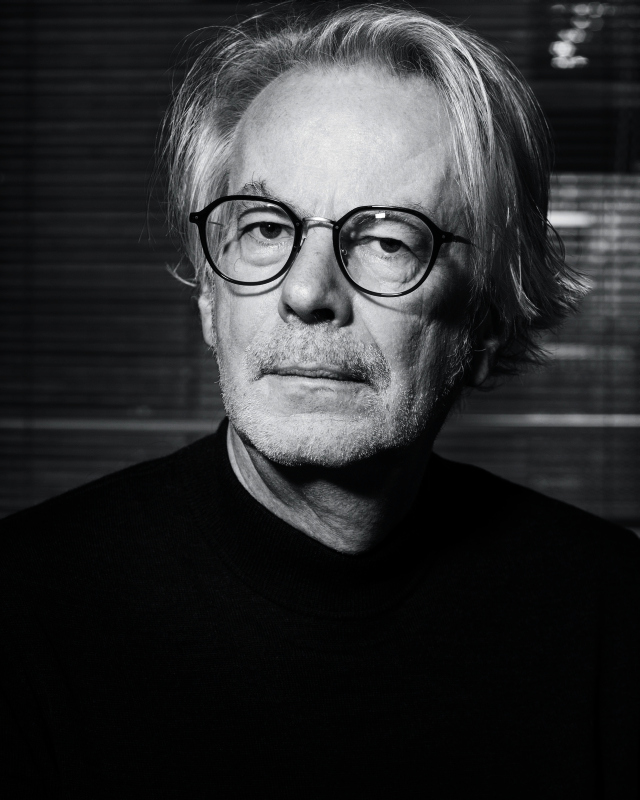
- Wim van Sinderen – Friso Keuris, 2020
- Born: 1958 (age 67–68); Dokkum
- Occupations: Photography curator, Journalist
- Known for: Senior Curator Fotomuseum Den Haag

Wim van Sinderen (born 10 January 1958) is a Dutch journalist and curator, working as photography curator at the Fotomuseum Den Haag.

== Live and work ==
Van Sinderen was born in Dokkum on January 10, 1958. From 1976 to 1982 he attended the Teacher Training College 'Ubbo Emmius' in Leeuwarden, where he received his BA in English language and literature and Fine Arts.

In 1981 Van Sinderen came into prominence as spokesman of a young artist group, called Jonge Friezen. A year earlier they had started a new cultural magazine, called Het Bestaan (The Existence). He took part is several exhibitions in those days and published his first book.

In 1982 Van Sinderen started his career as Photo Editor for the Amsterdam music magazine Vinyl. He was curator at the Kunsthal from the start in April 1992, where he worked with the director Wim van Krimpen. In 2002 he started as Senior Curator at Fotomuseum Den Haag. In 2022, he took early retirement due to health reasons.

== Publications ==
- Wim van Sinderen (ed.) Fotografen in Nederland : een anthologie 1852–2002, 2002
- Wim van Sinderen (et al.), Helena van der Kraan. The Hague Museum of Photography, Den Haag : Terra, 2005. ISBN 90-5897-373-5.
- Leonard Freed, William Ewing, Wim van Sinderen, Nathalie Herschdorfer. Leonard Freed: Worldview with Lausanne: Musée de l'Élysée, 2007. ISBN 978-3-86521-463-8
- Maartje van den Heuvel & Wim van Sinderen. Photography! A Special Collection at Leiden University. Leiden: Leiden University & The Hague Museum of Photography, 2010. ISBN 978-90-89101-91-4
