= Martine Poppe =

Norwegian artist

- Born: 1988 (age 37–38); Oslo, Norway
- Education: Slade School of Fine Art
- Style: Ultra contemporary

Martine Poppe (born 1988), is a contemporary artist known for her pale oil paintings on sailcloth with climate and feminism as central themes in her work. Poppe’s paintings are based on digital photographs of nature and carry the effects of diffracted light, overexposed photography, and the pixelation of blown-up digital images, resulting in a unique blend of abstraction and representation.

Poppe has been featured in numerous exhibitions, including New Order II - British Art Today at the Saatchi Gallery in London in 2014 and Girl meets girl at Vestfossen Kunstlaboratorium in Norway in 2022. Poppe’s works can be found in collections including the UK Government Art Collection, KODE Museums, the Saatchi Collection, Kistefos Museum and the Norwegian Broadcasting Corporation.

== Biography ==
Martine Poppe is a London-based Norwegian artist born in Oslo in 1988. She is the daughter of the photographer Tine Poppe and the niece of filmmaker and director Erik Poppe. Poppe graduated from the Slade School of Fine Art BA and MFA in 2011 and 2013 respectively. Her first exhibition was New Order II - British Art Today at the Saatchi Gallery in London in 2014.

== Career ==
Martine Poppe is most frequently exhibited in United Kingdom, and has also exhibited extensively in other countries such as the United States, Germany and Norway. Poppe has had several solo shows and numerous group shows, most frequently with Kristin Hjellegjerde Gallery (London, Berlin) and Brintz+County Gallery (Palm Beach, Florida). Poppe has also taken part in several international group exhibitions and art fairs, exhibiting alongside artists such as Jeremy Everett, Petra Cortright, Carolyn Salas, Sarah Mayohas and Eva LeWitt. Recent notable exhibitions include Girl meets girl at Vestfossen Kunstlaboratorium in Vestfossen, Norway in 2022, which included several internationally recognised artists, such as Katherine Bernhardt, Katherine Bradford, Rose Wylie, Caroline Walker, Annie Morris and Wanda Koop.

Solo exhibitions include Peering at the edge of daydreams, Kristin Hjellegjerde Gallery, Berlin (2023); Pause, County Gallery, Palm Beach, Florida (2021), A piece of me, Kristin Hjellegjerde Gallery, London (2021); Zima Blue, Kristin Hjellegjerde Gallery, Berlin (2020), Waiting for Y at Kristin Hjellegjerde Gallery, London (2019) and Portraits of trees at Trafo Kunsthall, Norway (2018/19), Crinkled escape routes and other somewhat flat things, Kristin Hjellegjerde Gallery, London (2016), 50% Grå, Trafo Kunsthall, Norway (2015) and Anatidaephobia, Kristin Hjellegjerde, London (2014).

Group exhibitions include Untitled Miami Beach, County Gallery, Miami (2022), Girl meets girl, Vestfossen Kunstlaboratorium, Vestfossen, Norway (2022), (De)construct, Paris (2022–23); BAD+, Bordeaux (2022), Galerie 208, Regeneration, Informality, Oxfordshire (2022), Art Paris, Kristin Hjellegjerde Gallery, Paris (2022), Dallas Art Fair, County Gallery, Dallas (2021), Facing the sun, Schloss Görne, Kristin Hjellegjerde Gallery, Berlin, Germany (2021), artmonte-carlo, VI, VII, Monaco (2019), ALAC, VI, VII, Los Angeles, Liste Art Fair, VI, VII, Basel (2018), Between the lines, Oslo National Academy of the Arts and the Women's Museum, Norway, 2018.

Poppe’s works can be found in collections including the UK Government Art Collection, KODE Museums, the Saatchi Collection, Kistefos Museum and the Norwegian Broadcasting Corporation.

== Works ==
Martine Poppe is a painter and sculptor who has gained recognition for her work that blends abstraction and representation with a focus on climate and digital photography. Poppe's creative process involves taking photographs of nature, such as clouds, and processing them digitally until they become almost illegible. These photographs are then printed out on a large scale and placed behind translucent fabrics on stretchers, creating a screen for the artist to work on with paint. The resulting paintings exhibit the effects of diffracted light, overexposed photography, and pixelation.

Poppe's sculptures recycles surplus materials from her creative process, such as textiles and photographs, to create standing barriers or scrunched-up shapes in the exhibition space. These sculptures and paintings provide an immersive experience for viewers and evoke the ever-changing and fragile nature of the environment.

In a 2021 Artsy article by Tomas Weber, Poppe's paintings are described as "at once meditative and grandiose" and "depict[ing] the fragile, fleeting qualities of light as it works its way across a drama of clouds and open sky,” concluding that “Poppe’s delicate, pixelated clouds contemplate our embeddedness within interconnected systems—the climate and the internet. Through Poppe’s highly physical markmaking, the paintings seem to ask us to inhabit those systems with greater care and attention to the earth-spanning consequences of our actions.”
