= Pólya–Szegő inequality =

Concept in mathematical analysis

In mathematical analysis, the Pólya–Szegő inequality (or Szegő inequality) states that the Sobolev energy of a function in a Sobolev space does not increase under symmetric decreasing rearrangement. The inequality is named after the mathematicians George Pólya and Gábor Szegő.

== Mathematical setting and statement ==
Given a Lebesgue measurable function $u:\R^n\to \R^+,$the symmetric decreasing rearrangement $u^*:\R^n\to \R^+,$ is the unique function such that for every $t \in \R,$ the sublevel set $u^*{}^{-1}((t, +\infty))$ is an open ball centred at the origin $0 \in \R^n$ that has the same Lebesgue measure as $u^{-1}((t, +\infty)).$

Equivalently, $u^*$ is the unique radial and radially nonincreasing function, whose strict sublevel sets are open and have the same measure as those of the function $u$.

The Pólya–Szegő inequality states that if moreover $u \in W^{1,p}(\R^n),$ then $u^* \in W^{1,p}(\R^n)$ and

$$\int_{\R^n} |\nabla u^*|^p  \leq \int_{\R^n} |\nabla u|^p.$$

== Applications of the inequality ==
The Pólya–Szegő inequality is used to prove the Rayleigh–Faber–Krahn inequality, which states that among all the domains of a given fixed volume, the ball has the smallest first eigenvalue for the Laplacian with Dirichlet boundary conditions. The proof goes by restating the problem as a minimization of the Rayleigh quotient.

The isoperimetric inequality can be deduced from the Pólya–Szegő inequality with $p = 1$.

The optimal constant in the Sobolev inequality can be obtained by combining the Pólya–Szegő inequality with some integral inequalities.

== Equality cases ==
Since the Sobolev energy is invariant under translations, any translation of a radial function achieves equality in the Pólya–Szegő inequality. There are however other functions that can achieve equality, obtained for example by taking a radial nonincreasing function that achieves its maximum on a ball of positive radius and adding to this function another function which is radial with respect to a different point and whose support is contained in the maximum set of the first function. In order to avoid this obstruction, an additional condition is thus needed.

It has been proved that if the function $u$ achieves equality in the Pólya–Szegő inequality and if the set $\{ x \in \mathbb{R}^n : u (x) > 0 \text{ and } \nabla u (x) = 0\}$ is a null set for Lebesgue's measure, then the function $u$ is radial and radially nonincreasing with respect to some point $a \in \mathbb{R}^n$.

== Generalizations ==
The Pólya–Szegő inequality is still valid for symmetrizations on the sphere or the hyperbolic space.

The inequality also holds for partial symmetrizations defined by foliating the space into planes (Steiner symmetrization) and into spheres (cap symmetrization).

There are also Pólya−Szegő inequalities for rearrangements with respect to non-Euclidean norms and using the dual norm of the gradient.

== Proofs of the inequality ==
=== Original proof by a cylindrical isoperimetric inequality ===
The original proof by Pólya and Szegő for $p = 2$ was based on an isoperimetric inequality comparing sets with cylinders and an asymptotics expansion of the area of the area of the graph of a function. The inequality is proved for a smooth function $u$ that vanishes outside a compact subset of the Euclidean space $\R^n.$ For every $\varepsilon > 0$, they define the sets

$$\begin{align}
C_\varepsilon   &= \{ (x, t) \in \R^n \times \R \, : \, 0 < t < \varepsilon u (x)  \} \\
C_\varepsilon^* &= \{ (x, t) \in \R^n \times \R \, : \, 0 < t < \varepsilon u^* (x)\}
\end{align}$$

These sets are the sets of points who lie between the domain of the functions $\varepsilon u$ and $\varepsilon u^*$ and their respective graphs. They use then the geometrical fact that since the horizontal slices of both sets have the same measure and those of the second are balls, to deduce that the area of the boundary of the cylindrical set $C_\varepsilon^*$ cannot exceed the one of $C_\varepsilon$. These areas can be computed by the area formula yielding the inequality

$$\int_{u^*{}^{-1} ((0,+\infty))} 1 + \sqrt{1 + \varepsilon^2 |\nabla u^*|^2}\le \int_{u^{-1} ((0,+\infty))} 1 + \sqrt{1 + \varepsilon^2 |\nabla u|^2}.$$

Since the sets $u^{-1} ((0, +\infty))$ and $u{}^*{}^{-1} ((0, +\infty))$ have the same measure, this is equivalent to

$$\frac{1}{\varepsilon} \int_{u^*{}^{-1} ((0, +\infty))} \sqrt{1 + \varepsilon^2 | \nabla u^*|^2} - 1 \le \frac{1}{\varepsilon} \int_{u^{-1} ((0, +\infty))} \sqrt{1 + \varepsilon^2 |\nabla u|^2} - 1.$$

The conclusion then follows from the fact that

$$\lim_{\varepsilon \to 0} \frac{1}{\varepsilon} \int_{u^{-1} ((0, +\infty))} \sqrt{1 + \varepsilon^2 | \nabla u|^2} - 1 = \frac{1}{2} \int_{\R^n} | \nabla u|^2.$$

=== Coarea formula and isoperimetric inequality ===
The Pólya–Szegő inequality can be proved by combining the coarea formula, Hölder’s inequality and the classical isoperimetric inequality.

If the function $u$ is smooth enough, the coarea formula can be used to write

$$\int_{\R^n} | \nabla u |^p = \int_0^{+\infty} \int_{u^{-1} ({t})} | \nabla u | ^{p - 1} \, d \mathcal{H}^{n - 1} \, dt,$$

where $\mathcal{H}^{n-1}$ denotes the $(n-1)$–dimensional Hausdorff measure on the Euclidean space $\R ^n$. For almost every each $t \in (0, +\infty)$, we have by Hölder's inequality,

$$\mathcal{H}^{n-1} \left(u^{-1} (\{t\})\right) \le \left(\int_{u^{-1} (\{t\})} |\nabla u | ^{p - 1}\right )^\frac{1}{p} \left(\int_{u^{-1} (\{t\})} \frac{1}{|\nabla u | } \right )^{1 - \frac{1}{p}}.$$

Therefore, we have

$$\int_{u^{-1} (\{t\})} |\nabla u | ^{p-1} \ge \frac{\mathcal{H}^{n - 1} \left(u^{-1} (\{t\})\right )^p}{\left(\int_{u^{-1} (\{t\})} \frac{1}{| \nabla u| }\right)^{p - 1}}.$$

Since the set $u^*{}^{-1} ((t, +\infty))$ is a ball that has the same measure as the set $u^{-1} ((t, +\infty))$, by the classical isoperimetric inequality, we have

$$\mathcal{H}^{n - 1} \left( u^{-1}(\{t\})\right) \ge \mathcal{H}^{n - 1} \left( u^*{}^{-1}(\{t\})\right).$$

Moreover, recalling that the sublevel sets of the functions $u$ and $u^*$ have the same measure,

$$\int_{u^*{}^{-1} (\{t\})} \frac{1}{|\nabla u^*| } = \int_{u^{-1} (\{t\})} \frac{1}{| \nabla u| },$$

and therefore,

$$\int_{\R^n} |\nabla u |^p \ge \int_0^{+\infty} \frac{\mathcal{H}^{n-1} \left (u^*{}^{-1} (\{t\})\right)^p}{\left(\int_{u^*{}^{-1} (\{t\})} \frac{1}{|\nabla u^*| }\right)^{p-1}}\,dt.$$

Since the function $u^*$ is radial, one has

$$\frac{\mathcal{H}^{n-1} \left(u^*{}^{-1} (\{t\})\right)^p} {\left(\int_{u^*{}^{-1} (\{t\})} \frac{1}{| \nabla u^*| }\right)^{p-1}}
= \int_{u^*{}^{-1} (\{t\})} |\nabla u^*| ^{p - 1},$$

and the conclusion follows by applying the coarea formula again.

=== Rearrangement inequalities for convolution ===
When $p=2$, the Pólya–Szegő inequality can be proved by representing the Sobolev energy by the heat kernel. One begins by observing that

$$\int_{\R^n} |\nabla u|^2 = \lim_{t \to 0} \frac{1}{t} \left (\int_{\R^n} |u|^2 - \int_{\R^n}\int_{\R^n} K_t (x-y) u(x) u(y) \,dx \,dy\right ),$$

where for $t \in (0, +\infty)$, the function $K_t : \R^n \to \R$ is the heat kernel, defined for every $z \in \R^n$ by

$$K_t (z) = \frac{1}{(4 \pi t)^\frac{n}{2}} e^{-\frac{|z|^2}{4t}}.$$

Since for every $t \in (0, + \infty)$ the function $K_t$ is radial and radially decreasing, we have by the Riesz rearrangement inequality

$$\int_{\R^n}\int_{\R^n} K_t (x - y)\, u (x)\, u (y) \, dx \,dy \le \int_{\R^n}\int_{\R^n} K_t (x-y)\, u^*(x)\, u^*(y) \, dx \,dy$$

Hence, we deduce that

$$\begin{align}
\int_{\R^n} |\nabla u|^2 &= \lim_{t \to 0} \frac{1}{t} \left (\int_{\R^n} |u|^2 - \int_{\R^n}\int_{\R^n} K_t (x-y) u(x) u(y) \, dx \,dy\right ) \\[6pt]
&\ge \lim_{t \to 0} \frac{1}{t} \left (\int_{\R^n} |u|^2 - \int_{\R^n}\int_{\R^n} K_t (x-y) u^*(x) u^*(y) \, dx \,dy\right) \\[6pt]
&= \int_{\R^n} | \nabla u^*|^2.
\end{align}$$
