= Snoecks =

Belgian almanac

Snoecks was a Belgian almanac. The 550-plus-page magazine was published once a year in October and focused on new international developments in the arts, photography and literature. It was in circulation between 1925 and 2022.

== History and profile ==
It was started in 1925 under the title Groote Snoeck's Almanak. Later it was renamed as Snoecks. Its modern form, with an emphasis on photography, had its base in the seventies. Its editor-in-chief was Geert Stadeus from 2004 to until his death in November 2021. Snoecks folded in 2022 after publishing its 98th edition. The magazine featured artists such as Anton Corbijn, Larry Sultan, Matthew Barney, Terry Richardson, Ron Mueck, Alberto Garcia-Alix, Peter Lindbergh, Albert Watson, Desiree Dolron, Bettina Rheims, Diana Scheunemann, Timothy Greenfield-Sanders and Andres Serrano.
