= Kees Timmer =

Dutch artist (1903–1978)

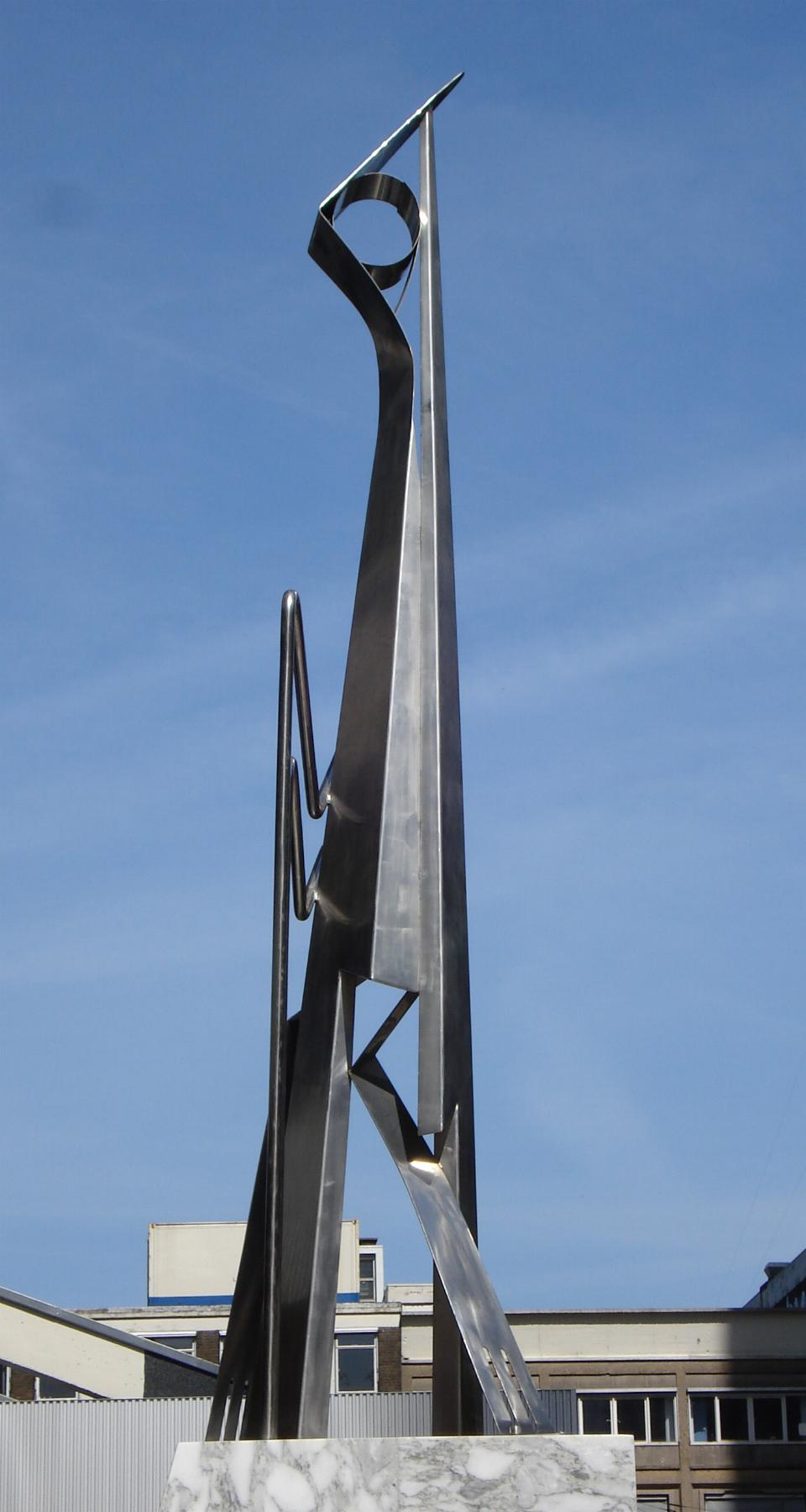
Phoenix, (1954), Rotterdam kunstwerk.

Cornelis (Cees or Kees) Timmer (20 June 1903 – 24 January 1978) was a Dutch artist, who worked as sculptor, graphic artist, monumental artist, wall painter, painter, draftsman, jeweler, and mosaicist.

Born in Zaandam in 1903, Timmer settled in Rotterdam in 1923. He attended evening art classes at the Academie voor Beeldende Kunsten (now Willem de Kooning Academy, where Herman Mees taught painting, and David Bautz drawing. In 1928 he was awarded the Silver Academy Medal (de zilveren Academiemedaille).

In the 1920s there was little action in the Rotterdam art world, and artists in the whole of Netherlands were struggling. Timmer focussed on the production of payable art with subjects as monkeys, and the circus. Beside figurative animal painting he also made portrait, and self-portrait. Still his art didn't sell well. Later in his career he made murals for schools and factories, and also constructed concrete and metal sculptures.

Timmer's work was included in the 1939 exhibition and sale Onze Kunst van Heden (Our Art of Today) at the Rijksmuseum in Amsterdam.

In 1962-63 he lectured head and figure study at the Royal Academy of Art, The Hague, and in 1966 was awarded the Hendrik Chabot Prize. He died in 1978 in Rotterdam. The Museum Boijmans Van Beuningen held a major retrospective of his paintings in 1993.
