= Piet van Stuivenberg =

Dutch artist (1901–1988)

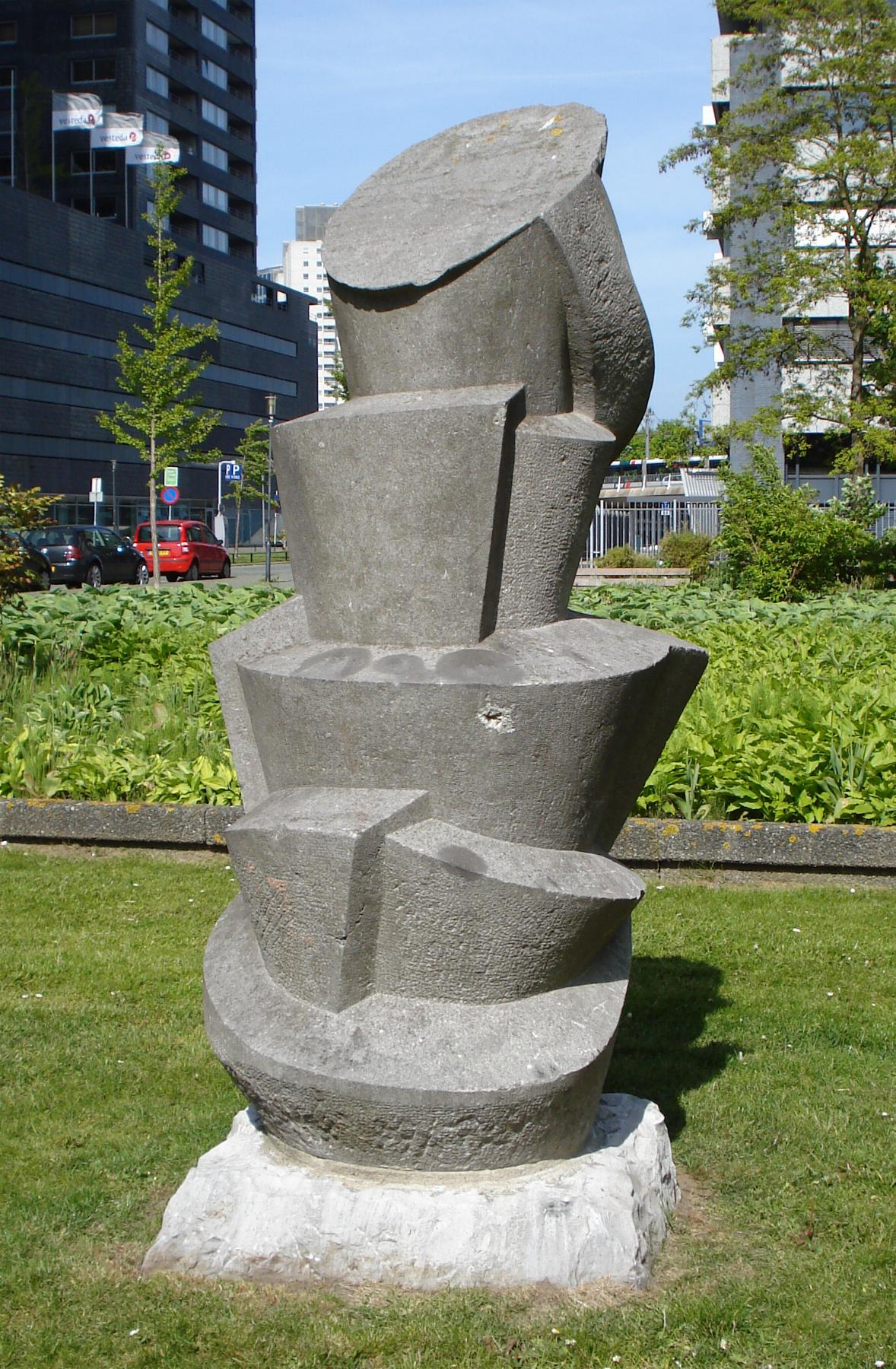
Untitled (1950), Rotterdam

Pieter Antonie (Piet or Pieter) van Stuivenberg (10 January 1901 – 16 December 1988) was a Dutch artist, who was active as a sculptor, painter, lithographer, and graphic artist.

Born in Schiedam, Van Stuivenberg received his art education at the Academy of Fine Arts and Applied Sciences (now Willem de Kooning Academy) in Rotterdam. From 1921 to 1927, he attended evening art classes in sculpting.

Van Stuivenberg started his sculpting career as a stonemason, and was first influenced by expressionism, later adopting an abstract style characterised by geometric shapes and cleaner forms. In Rotterdam he joined the artist group R33, which was founded in 1933 and disbanded in 1941. He made study trips to Brussels, London and Paris. In the Netherlands, he subsequently joined the artist group Vrije Beelden (Free Images), founded by the Rotterdam artists Koos van Vlijmen and Wout van Heusden and others in 1946. He also joined the group Creatie (Creation), founded by Willy Boers en Ger Gerrits in 1950. In 1950, his work was represented at the fifth Salon des Réalités Nouvelles in Paris.

In 1967, Van Stuivenberg received the Hendrik Chabot Award, and in 1981 and 1994 a retrospective exhibition of his work was held by the Stedelijk Museum Schiedam. His work is in the collections of the Stedelijk Museum Amsterdam, Museum Boijmans Van Beuningen in Rotterdam and in the Stedelijk Museum Schiedam.

== Works in public space ==
- 1950 – Rotterdam : Zonder titel, Gedempte Zalmhaven (his first abstract sculpture in Rotterdam made for the Rotterdam Bouwcentrum)
- 1957 – Schiedam : Drie kinderen, Burg. van Harenlaan (De Hoeksteen)
- 1965 – Rotterdam : Zonder titel, an abstract marble plastic intended for Tench Square in Rotterdam-Hoogvliet
- 1968 – Schiedam : Geborgenheid
- 1970 – Rotterdam : Dolle Jans droom (1969), Steiger
- 1977 – Schiedam : Moeder en kind, Grote Markt
