= Layer cake representation =

Concept in mathematics

Layer cake representation.

In mathematics, the layer cake representation of a non-negative, real-valued measurable function $f$ defined on a measure space $(\Omega,\mathcal{A},\mu)$ is the formula

$$f(x) = \int_0^\infty 1_{L(f, t)} (x) \, \mathrm{d}t,$$

for all $x \in \Omega$, where $1_E$ denotes the indicator function of a subset $E\subseteq \Omega$ and $L(f,t)$ denotes the (strict) super-level set:

$$L(f, t) = \{ y \in \Omega \mid f(y) \geq t \}\;\;\;{\text{or}\;
L(f, t) = \{ y \in \Omega \mid f(y) > t \}}.$$

The layer cake representation follows easily from observing that

$$1_{L(f, t)}(x) = 1_{[0, f(x)]}(t)\;\;\;
{\text{or}\;1_{L(f, t)}(x) = 1_{[0, f(x))}(t)}$$

where either integrand gives the same integral:

$$f(x) = \int_0^{f(x)} \,\mathrm{d}t.$$

The layer cake representation takes its name from the representation of the value $f(x)$ as the sum of contributions from the "layers" $L(f,t)$: "layers"/values $t$ below $f(x)$ contribute to the integral, while values $t$ above $f(x)$ do not. It is a generalization of Cavalieri's principle and is also known under this name.

== Applications ==
The layer cake representation can be used to rewrite the Lebesgue integral as an improper Riemann integral. For the measure space, $(\Omega,\mathcal{A},\mu)$, let $S\subseteq\Omega$, be a measureable subset ($S\in\mathcal{A})$ and $f$ a non-negative measureable function. By starting with the Lebesgue integral, then expanding $f(x)$, then exchanging integration order (see Fubini-Tonelli theorem) and simplifying in terms of the Lebesgue integral of an indicator function, we get the Riemann integral:

$$\begin{align}
\int_S f(x)\,\text{d}\mu(x)
&= \int_S \int_0^\infty 1_{\{x\in\Omega\mid f(x)>t\}}(x)\,\text{d}t\,\text{d}\mu(x) \\
&= \int_0^\infty\!\! \int_S 1_{\{x\in\Omega\mid f(x)>t\}}(x)\,\text{d}\mu(x)\,\text{d}t\\
&= \int_0^\infty\!\! \int_\Omega 1_{\{x\in S\mid f(x)>t\}}(x)\,\text{d}\mu(x)\,\text{d}t\\
&= \int_0^{\infty} \mu(\{x\in S \mid f(x)>t\})\,\text{d}t.
\end{align}$$

This can be used in turn, to rewrite the integral for the L^{p}-space p-norm, for $1\leq p<+\infty$:

$$\int_\Omega |f(x)|^p \, \mathrm{d}\mu(x) = p\int_0^{\infty} s^{p-1}\mu(\{ x \in \Omega:|f(x)| > s \}) \mathrm{d}s,$$

which follows immediately from the change of variables $t=s^{p}$ in the layer cake representation of $|f(x)|^p$. This representation can be used to prove Markov's inequality and Chebyshev's inequality.

== See also ==
- Symmetric decreasing rearrangement
