= Wendelien van Oldenborgh =

Dutch artist

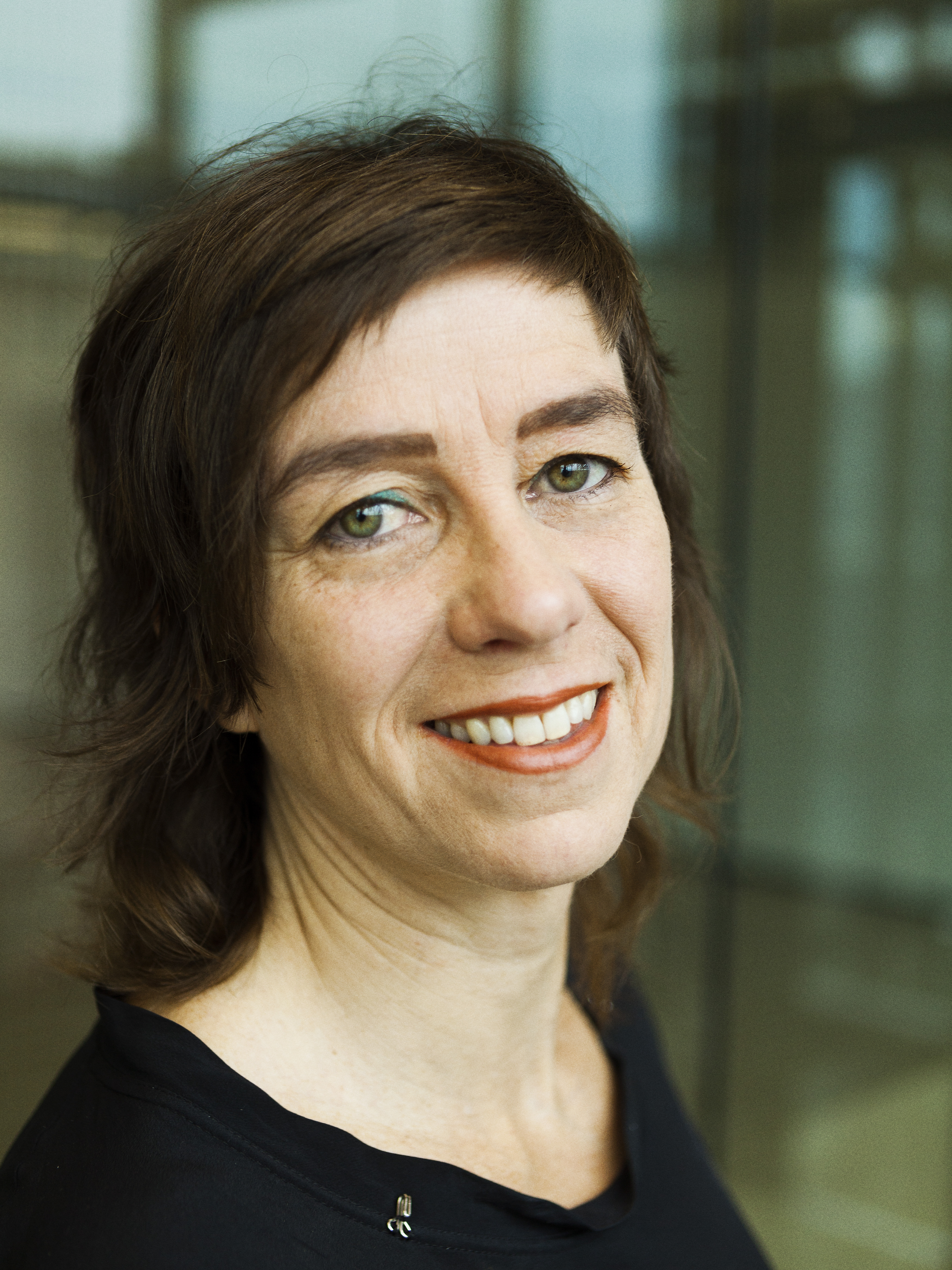
Wendelien van Oldenborgh, 2014

Wendelien van Oldenborgh (born 28 December 1962) is a Dutch artist. She works as installation artist, painter and video artist.

== Biography ==
Born in Rotterdam, van Oldenborgh studied at Goldsmiths, University of London from 1982 to 1986.

After her graduation she started as independent artist in London. Subsequently, she was visiting student at the École nationale supérieure des Beaux-Arts in Paris in 1989–1990. In 1990 she settled in Antwerp, where she worked until 2000. From 2001 to 2003 she worked in Stuttgart, Germany on a stipendium by the Künstlerhaus Stuttgart. In 2007 she was visiting scholar at the Fundação Armando Alvares Penteado in São Paulo, Brazil. Since 2010 she lives and works in Rotterdam. She is described as an "artist engaged in social practice".

Van Oldenborgh was awarded the Hendrik Chabot Prize in 2011, and then in 2014 the Dr. A.H. Heineken Prize for Art.

In 2017, she represented the Netherlands at the 57th Venice Biennial.

== Selected publications ==
- Wendelien Van Oldenborgh (2004). Stadtluft.
- Wendelien van Oldenborgh. Wendelien van Oldenborgh: as occasions. Tent., 2008.
- Wendelien van Oldenborgh, Helena Reckitt, A Space (Art gallery) (2010), Wendelien Van Oldenborgh: The Past is Never Dead.
- Binna Choi, Wendelien van Oldenborgh (2010), A Well Respected Man, Or Book of Echoes.
