= KM21 =

KM21, museum for contemporary art
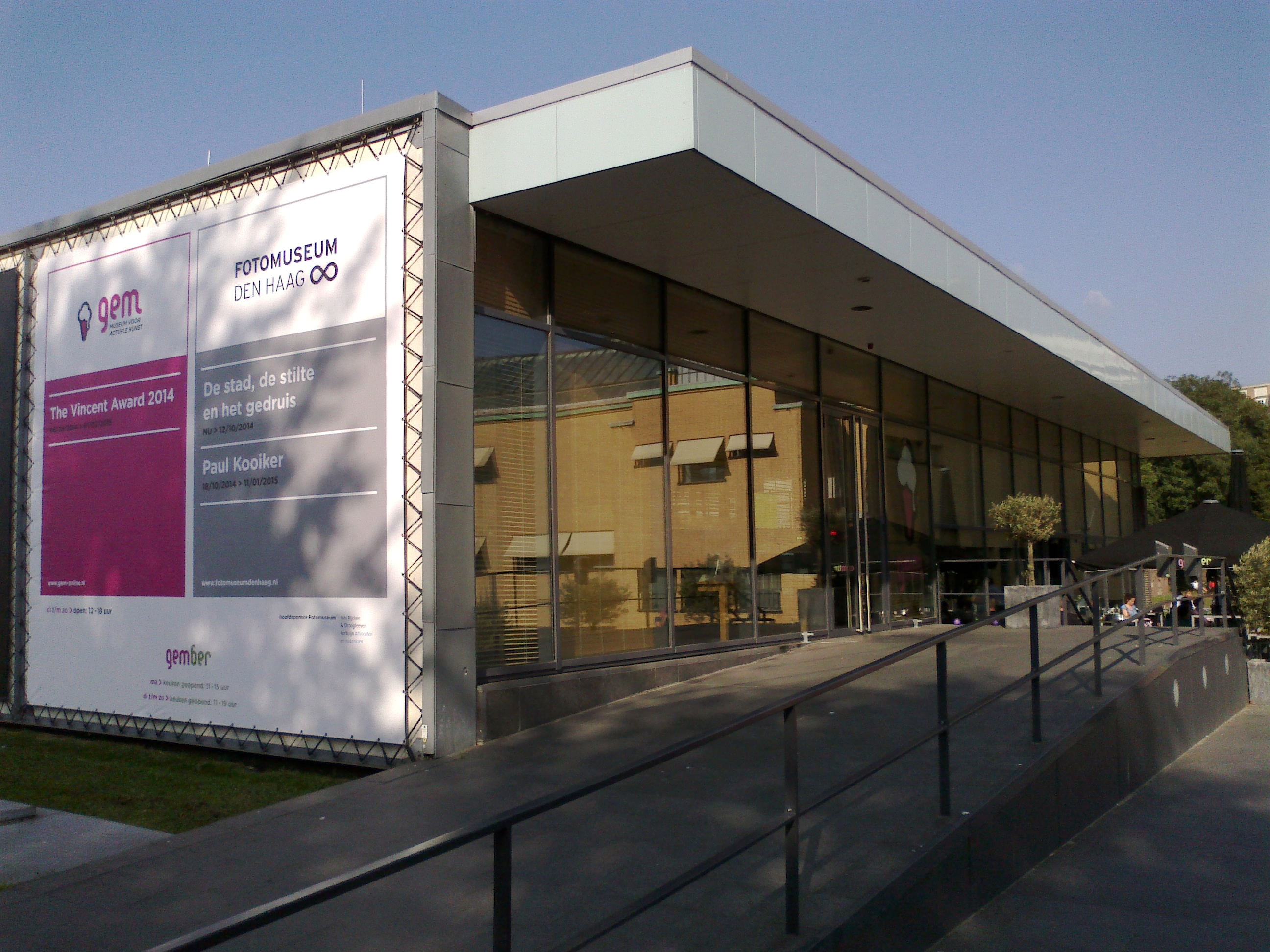
- Entrance KM21 and Museum for Photography, The Hague

- Location in South Holland in the Netherlands
- Established: 2002
- Location: Stadhouderslaan 43; The Hague, Netherlands
- Coordinates: 52°5′26″N 4°16′47″E
- Type: Art museum
- Director: Margriet Schravemaker
- Curator: Yasmijn Jarram
- Website: www.km21.nl

KM21 is a museum for contemporary visual art in The Hague in the Netherlands. The museum was established in 2002 as part of the Kunstmuseum Den Haag. In KM21 work by artists from The Hague, the Netherlands and international contemporaries is exhibited.

A wide diversity of disciplines is on show: installations, video installations, painting and sculpture, multimedia, performance, film, photography, drawing, digital art, design, etc. In addition to exhibitions, activities such as lectures, discussions, performances, film screenings and book presentations also take place. The museum is located beside the Kunstmuseum Den Haag and also houses the Fotomuseum Den Haag (The Hague Museum of Photography).

== History ==
KM21 was set up in 2002 by the Kunstmuseum Den Haag under the name Gem, Contemporary Art, (abbreviated to GEM) to display the contemporary visual art held by the museum. It was located in the renovated Schamhart Wing next to the Kunstmuseum, and continues to shares this building with The Hague Museum of Photography. In 2016 the GEM and the Museum of Photography traded placed to give more room to the Museum of Photography.

== Exhibitions ==
The opening exhibition in 2002 was about the American artist Raymond Pettibon. It offered an "overwhelming amount of drawing... partly framed and partly pinned directly to the wall." It was described as "a sinister body of work, in which serial killers, dictators, baseball players, movie stars and comic book heroes play the leading roles."

In 2021 the museum organized exhibitions of artists such as the South African painter Lisa Brice, the Groningen artist Alida Pott (1888-1931). and the Scottish-born contemporary visual artist Caroline Walker.

== Visitor Numbers ==
These visitor numbers are for KM21 and the Fotomuseum combined.

Year	Visitors	Notes
2023	61,052	
2022	50,010	
2021	24,399	Closed for 169 days, open for 196 days (with restrictions)
2020	50,000	The museums were closed 112 days due to corona measures
2019	147,684	
2018	84,749	
