= Tine Poppe =

Norwegian photographer (born 1957)

Tine Poppe (born Kristine Hildur Poppe; 1957) is a Norwegian photographer based in Oslo whose work spans documentary photography and fine-art photography. Her practice has been described as focusing on social, political, existential and environmental issues, and she is known for projects including Exit Wonderland, Winter Solstice, White Is Not a Color, No Man's Land and Gilded Lilies.

== Career ==
Poppe came to wider international attention through projects that combine documentary concerns with constructed or stylized imagery. Her series Exit Wonderland, made during a road trip from New Mexico to California, was selected in the 2016 LensCulture Emerging Talent Awards. LensCulture presented the work as politically charged and dystopian, while other coverage framed its American landscapes as surreal, dreamlike and cinematic.

Poppe's 2017 series Winter Solstice was a finalist in the LensCulture Street Photography Awards. LensCulture described the work as rooted in Norway's winter darkness while also connecting it to dependence on fossil fuels and wider environmental anxiety.

In 2019, Poppe received Fotografiprisen. Coverage of the award in Journalisten described it as Norwegian photography's highest distinction and presented Poppe as a photographer whose work had already received substantial recognition abroad.

Poppe's photographs reached a broader international audience in The Atlantic in 2021, when Sabrina Imbler's "A Bug's Life" featured Poppe's images of wildflowers photographed from ground level in Norway in order to imagine the meadow from an insect's point of view.

One of Poppe's best-known later projects is Gilded Lilies, a series about the environmental cost of the global cut-flower industry. Sources on the work describe it as staging shop-bought flowers against landscape imagery from environmentally vulnerable places and as reworking still life and portrait traditions in order to connect floral beauty with climate change, consumerism and artificial perfection.

In 2023, Gilded Lilies was recognised in LensCulture's Critics' Choice Awards, and in 2024 it placed third in the Professional Creative category of the Sony World Photography Awards.

In 2025, Poppe was included in the Royal Photographic Society's 166th International Photography Exhibition, shown at Saatchi Gallery in London. Coverage in Time Out singled out her botanical photographs among the notable works in the exhibition.

== Themes and style ==
Published coverage presents Poppe as a photographer whose work moves between documentary concerns and deliberately constructed or manipulated imagery. Journalisten described her as politically engaged and suggested that she uses visual appeal strategically, drawing viewers into images that carry a social or political message rather than functioning as pure decoration. The same profile said that she works across advertising and documentary photography and treats post-production as an important part of how mood and meaning are shaped in the image.

Other sources similarly frame her practice as moving beyond straightforward reportage into stylized, atmospheric and conceptually structured forms. Across her projects, critics and interviewers have linked her work to environmental concern, social justice, and the tension between beauty and ecological fragility.

Floral imagery has been especially central to her later work. Sources on Gilded Lilies describe the series as linking the beauty of flowers to the hidden environmental costs of industrial cultivation, genetic modification, transport and consumption.

== Publications and reception ==
Poppe's work has appeared in publications including The Atlantic, The Guardian, National Geographic, Fotografisk Tidskrift, RPS Journal and Lenscratch. Fotografisk Tidskrift featured her on the cover of issue 3/2025 and published a portfolio centred on flowers and plants.

Artist and exhibition biographies describe her work as having been published and exhibited internationally and acquired by governmental and corporate collections in Norway and abroad.

== Awards and exhibitions ==
Poppe's work has been recognised by the Sony World Photography Awards, LensCulture Emerging Talent Awards, LensCulture Street Photography Awards, LensCulture Critics' Choice Awards and Fotografiprisen. Additional biographical and exhibition sources also list recognition from the IPA International Photography Awards and PX3 Prix de la Photographie Paris.

Exhibitions and festival presentations listed by artist and gallery biographies include the Gilded Lilies solo exhibition at Galleri Kunstverket in Oslo in 2023, participation in 212 Photography Istanbul in 2023, Festival La Gacilly-Baden in Austria in 2022, and group exhibitions at Oslo Negativ and Nordic Light.

== Personal life ==
Poppe is the daughter of Per Frølich Poppe, a fashion designer, and Aase Ellinor Poppe. She grew up in Norway and Portugal and is the sister of the film director Erik Poppe. She is the mother of the artist Martine Poppe.
