= Marleen Sleeuwits =

Dutch artist (born 1980)

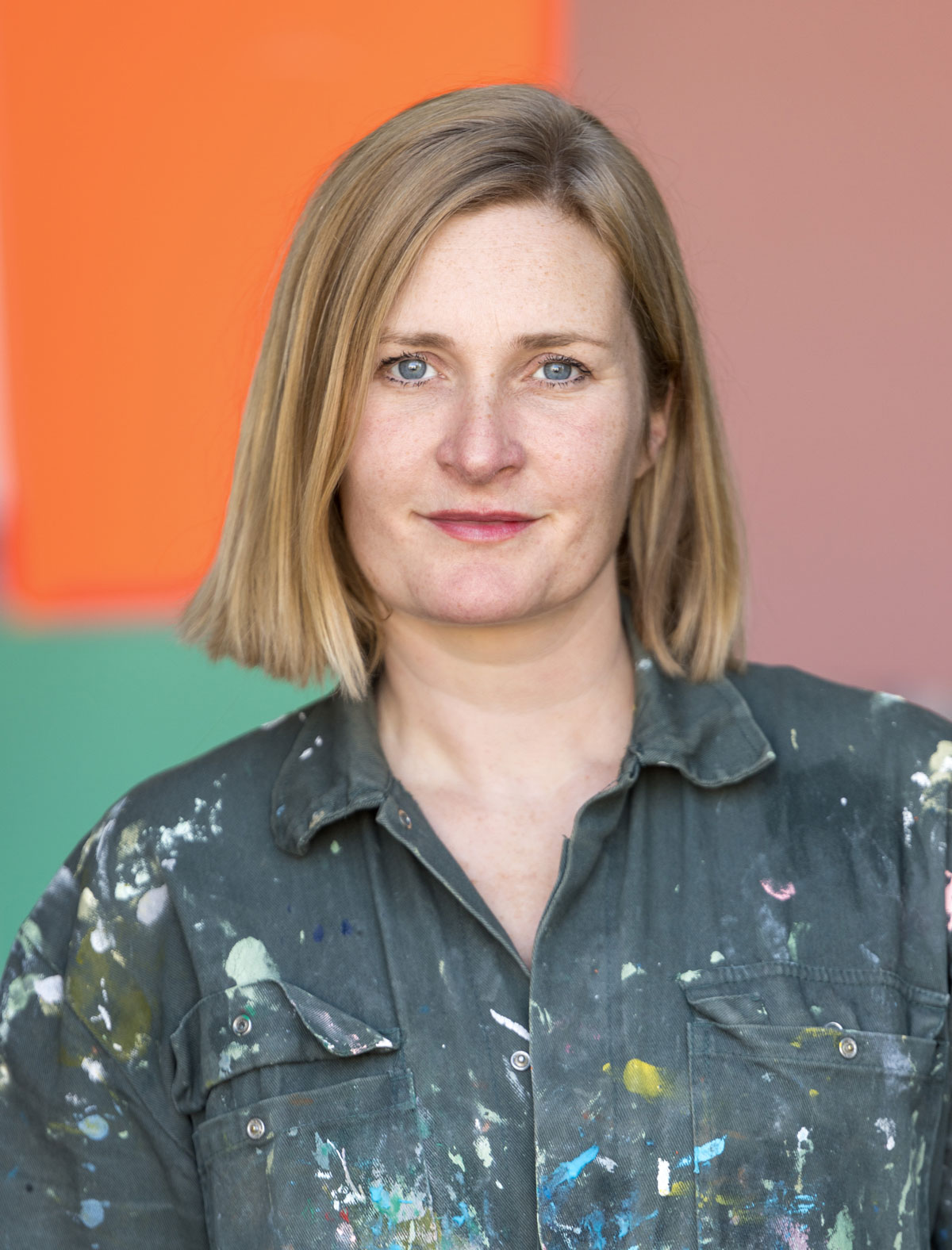
- Marleen Sleeuwits (2024)
- Born: June 23, 1980 (age 46); Enschede, Netherlands
- Education: Royal Academy of Art, The Hague; AKV St. Joost
- Known for: Contemporary art; Visual arts; Photography
- Website: Official Website

Marleen Sleeuwits (born 23 June 1980) is a Dutch multidisciplinary artist working in photography, sculpture, and installation. Based in The Hague, her art aims to challenge perceptions of scale, perspective and spatial reality. Her work is characterised by what she terms the "peau des villes" (skin of cities) concept, exploring how humans relate to built environments through temporary interventions in vacant spaces. Her work engages with architectural spaces and the built environment, often involving temporary interventions in vacant or unused locations.

Sleeuwits has exhibited internationally with solo shows at institutions such as Fotomuseum Den Haag, Kunsthal, and the Centre Photographique Rouen Normandie. Her work is held in collections including Museum Boijmans van Beuningen, Valkhof Museum and the Dutch Ministry of Foreign Affairs. She was recognized as FOAM Talent in 2012 and won the Meijburg Art Commission in 2019.

== Early life and education ==
Sleeuwits was born on 23 June 1980 in Enschede, Netherlands.

At the age of 14, she took a photography course at a local community centre, sparking her interest in photography.

She studied photography at the Royal Academy of Art, The Hague, earning her bachelor's degree in 2001. She then completed a master's degree in Photography at AKV St. Joost in Breda in 2005.

== Work ==
In her early career, Sleeuwits focused on photographing architectural spaces and urban environments. Her artistic practice evolved from photographing spaces to physically intervening in them, and she began constructing her own spaces. She was interested in exploring what she describes as "impersonal environments" — vacant spaces such as empty office buildings, unused shopping centres, and abandoned institutional buildings that became available during economic downturns, particularly after the 2008 financial crisis.

Sleeuwits's work has been described as abstract and conceptual. She integrates photography with sculpture and installations to alter spaces and create a sense of disorientation for the viewer. Her core themes explore the borderland between two-dimensional and three-dimensional art, the transformation of everyday spaces, and the use of optical illusions and the manipulation of perspective.

Sleeuwits often incorporates common architectural elements, such as ceiling panels, insulation, and fluorescent lighting. Many of her installations are interactive, allowing viewers to navigate through the structures. Drawing inspiration from ordinary environments such as sports fields or changing rooms, her work often evokes a sense of alienation in these familiar spaces.

Her 2021 solo exhibition Isomatrix at Kunsthal in Rotterdam explored the boundary between fiction and reality using materials such as neon lights, foil, photographic prints, and mirrors to manipulate perspective, reflection, and scale within architectural spaces. In her 2025 solo exhibition Enter the Cube at the Fotomuseum Den Haag, Sleeuwits created a site-specific installation in dialogue with the work of Sol LeWitt. Another solo exhibition, Re-Surface, was held at Galerie Bart in Amsterdam during Amsterdam Art Week, focusing on the exploration of everyday interiors and their often unnoticed aesthetics.

Sleeuwits's first major monograph, On the Soft Edge of Space, was published in 2016. It featured 200 images across 276 pages with essays by Edo Dijksterhuis, Basje Boer, and Freek Lomme. De Volkskrant selected the publication as one of the best Dutch photography books of 2016.

== Personal life ==
Sleeuwits lives and works in The Hague, Netherlands.

== Exhibitions ==
Sleeuwits has been represented by Galerie Bart in Amsterdam since 2019 and by Sous Les Etoiles Gallery in New York City. Previous representation included LhGWR Gallery in The Hague and FeldbuschWiesnerRudolph in Berlin.

Solo Exhibitions
Year	Title	Institution	Location	Ref
2005		Fotofestival Breda	Breda	
2019		Centre Photographique Rouen Normandie	France	
2021	Isomatrix	Kunsthal Light #24 program, Kunsthal Rotterdam	Rotterdam	
2023–2024	IN SITU	Centre Photographique Rouen Normandie	France	
2025	Ongoing Series of False Ceilings	The Palace of Justice (Nest ruimte voor kunst)	The Hague	
2025	Re-Surface	Galerie Bart	Amsterdam	
2025	Enter the Cube (with outdoor installation during The Hague's Spiegelfestival)	Fotomuseum Den Haag	The Hague	
2025	Enter the Cube	Galerie Bart	Amsterdam	
2025	Solo presentation	Paris Photo	Paris, France	
2026		Galerie Arts	Brno, Czech Republic	
2026		De Spelonk	The Hague	

Selected Group Exhibitions
Year	Title	Institution	Location	Ref
2013–2014	WHITE I PHOTOGRAPHY, ART, DESIGN, FASHION, FILM	Netherlands Photo Museum	Rotterdam	
2014	QuickscanNL#02	Netherlands Photo Museum	Rotterdam	
2019	Royal Encounters	Museum Escher	The Hague	
2023	Space: Moonshot part two	Museum Het Valkhof	Nijmegen	
2024	Meta Festival (site-specific installation Color Glitch)	Meta Festival	Shanghai, China	
2025	Biennale d'Images Tangible		Paris, France	
2025	Spiegelfestival (site-specific installation Enter the Cube)		The Hague	
2026	Blow Up Art Jubilee		The Hague	

== Awards and recognition ==
- 2022: Kunstenaar Basis grant (also awarded other grants from Mondriaan Fund)
- 2021: Prix de Rome (nominated) — Netherlands' art award for artists under 35.
- 2019: Meijburg Art Commission — an award to make a site-specific work for KPMG Meijburg & Co offices, for which she made Interior no. 52 (2019) for KPMG Meijburg & Co's Amstelveen office. The work features dynamic lighting cycles and explores the boundaries between two and three-dimensional space.
- 2013: Prix de Rome (nominated) — Netherlands' art award for artists under 35.
- 2013: International Festival of Fashion and Photography, Hyères, France (Finalist)
- 2012: Foam Talent, Foam Fotografiemuseum, Amsterdam — annual recognition program for emerging photographers.

== Collections ==
=== Museum collections ===
- Museum Boijmans Van Beuningen, Rotterdam
- Museum Het Valkhof, Nijmegen

=== Corporate collections ===
- AkzoNobel Art Collection
- KPMG Meijburg & Co.
- ING Group
- NN Group
- Erasmus University Rotterdam
- De Brauw Blackstone Westbroek

=== International collections ===
- Schloss Kummerow Photographic Collection

== Publications ==
- Sleeuwits, Marleen (2016). On the Soft Edge of Space. Onomatopee. ISBN 9491677519.
- Sleeuwits, Marleen (2016). "Essay contribution". Prime Time: Archetypes of Abstraction in Photography.
