= Riesz rearrangement inequality =

In mathematics, the Riesz rearrangement inequality, sometimes called Riesz–Sobolev inequality, states that any three non-negative functions $f : \mathbb{R}^n \to \mathbb{R}^+$, $g : \mathbb{R}^n \to \mathbb{R}^+$ and $h : \mathbb{R}^n \to \mathbb{R}^+$ satisfy the inequality

$$\iint_{\mathbb{R}^n\times \mathbb{R}^n} f(x) g(x-y) h(y) \, dx\,dy
\le \iint_{\mathbb{R}^n\times \mathbb{R}^n} f^*(x) g^*(x-y) h^*(y) \, dx\,dy,$$

where $f^* : \mathbb{R}^n \to \mathbb{R}^+$, $g^* : \mathbb{R}^n \to \mathbb{R}^+$ and $h^* : \mathbb{R}^n \to \mathbb{R}^+$ are the symmetric decreasing rearrangements of the functions $f$, $g$ and $h$ respectively.

== History ==
The inequality was first proved by Frigyes Riesz in 1930, and independently reproved by S.L.Sobolev in 1938. Brascamp, Lieb and Luttinger have shown that it can be generalized to arbitrarily (but finitely) many functions acting on arbitrarily many variables.

== Applications ==
The Riesz rearrangement inequality can be used to prove the Pólya–Szegő inequality.

== Proofs ==
=== One-dimensional case ===
In the one-dimensional case, the inequality is first proved when the functions $f$, $g$ and $h$ are characteristic functions of a finite unions of intervals. Then the inequality can be extended to characteristic functions of measurable sets, to measurable functions taking a finite number of values and finally to nonnegative measurable functions.

=== Higher-dimensional case ===
In order to pass from the one-dimensional case to the higher-dimensional case, the spherical rearrangement is approximated by Steiner symmetrization for which the one-dimensional argument applies directly by Fubini's theorem.

== Equality cases ==
In the case where any one of the three functions is a strictly symmetric-decreasing function, equality holds only when the other two functions are equal, up to translation, to their symmetric-decreasing rearrangements.
