= Feminist urbanism =

Urban planning theory focused on women

Feminist urbanism is a theory and social movement concerning the impact of the built environment on women. The theory aims to understand what it means to be a woman in an urban space and what struggles and opportunities women encounter in these environments.

Proponents of feminist urbanism advance a perspective that is critical of patriarchal and capitalist systems that have shaped and continue to shape architecture and urban planning, while negatively impacting women's lives. Feminist urbanism also refers to the ways, both positive and negative, in which the built environment influences women's relations, freedoms, opportunities, mobility, and daily activities. As urban environments continue to grow globally, feminist urbanism argues that understanding the ways in which cultural, political, and economic systems have limited and oppressed women is necessary to create a future built environment that is more equitable, inclusive, sustainable, and enjoyable for all people.

Feminist urbanist theory approaches life in urban environments from the point of view of the commons or shared resources, housing, public space, mobility, safety, sustainability, and design.

== History of women in urban environments ==
=== Care work and gender roles ===
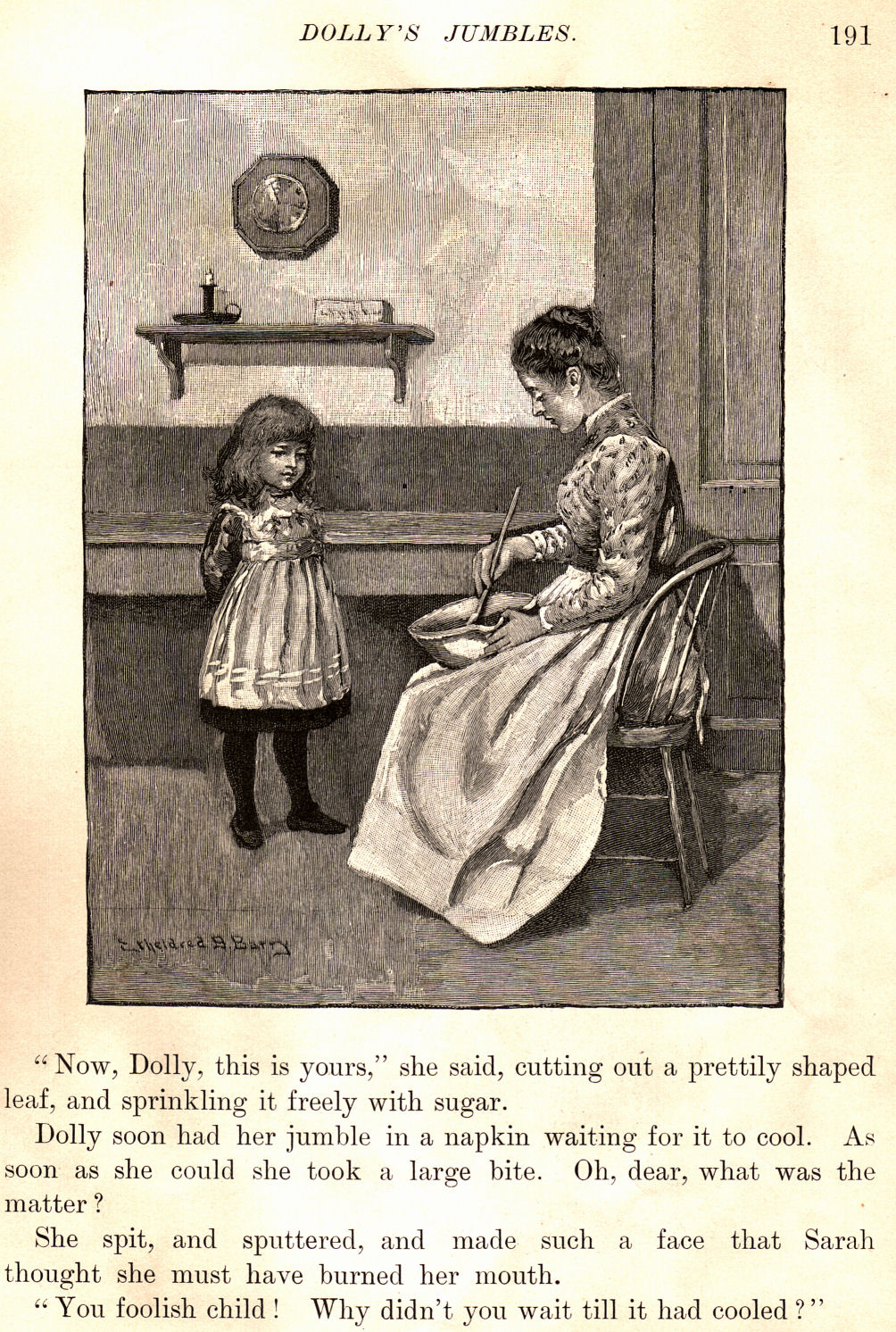
Childcare. 1800s

Care work in the context of domestic environments, as defined by Silvia Federici, is a “form of gendered economic oppression and an exploitation upon which all of capitalism rests.” Historically, the responsibilities of domestic work and reproductive labor have fallen exponentially heavier on women. This unjust and unequitable share of responsibilities have prevented women from pursuing goals and freedoms outside of domesticity.

From the Stone Age to the pre-industrial societies, women were responsible for child-care and other domestic activities such as agriculture, cooking, cleaning, and making clothes while men engaged in hunting and building activities. As nomadic civilizations started to settle, technological developments guided communities into more complex systems of relationships, economics, and political organization, as well as an increased diversification of service needs and labor sectors. Since women were the ones who could birth and breast feed, childcare continued to be disproportionately put on women, while men were increasingly being liberated from reproductive and care-work responsibilities.

With the Industrial Revolution, a rapid growth of settlements made the binary gender imbalance more dramatic, forcing women to limit their contribution to society to the boundaries of domestic environments. Federici claims that this “enclosure was made natural, as if domesticity was simply women’s inherent condition and desire." The periods of this transition and the strategies of oppression vary from country to country, but the spatial division between residential and socio-economic centers and the unequal empowerment between men and women remain at the root of inequitable urban environments across the world.

The economic growth and social stability of our societies is reliant on women as they give birth and raise the labor force, as well as take care of domestic environments. Women handle this type of work without receiving any compensation and are forced to give up other economic or professional opportunities. These limitations make women dependent on men for money, which has a direct effect on their freedoms and agency. Moreover, non-nuclear families also suffer from this inequality, as families led by a female partnership struggle to achieve economic stability with lower wages than men. Men that form a family also struggle to balance it with labor demands.

Women who join the labor force struggle to care for children and housework and often delegate their responsibilities to lower-income women for low wages. Consequently, women involved in paid childcare are often forced to move away from their own children. Women who join the labor force are often called “domestic failures.” Professional women also find themselves having to work harder to compete in a male economy, are paid lower wages and sometimes feel obliged to sacrifice marriage or childbearing for independence and professional growth. The imbalance of reproductive labor and domestic responsibilities between genders has direct and destructive consequences to economic development, environmental sustainability, democracy, health, childcare, and the just development of cities.

Political scientist Hannah Arendt claimed that “the city is an organized memory, and in history women are the forgotten.” Gender shapes the way that women can move through the city and the choices that are available to them. The way cities have been built has contributed to enforcing patriarchal family and social and labor roles. Geographical segregation, displacement, discrimination, and poverty have further influenced the urbanization processes and worsened women's quality of life.

However, that women are a heterogenous group and differences in race, socio-economic status, education, income, sexual orientation, ethnicity, health, and other factors affect the degree and the ways in which patriarchal systems affect women's lives and urban experience. Indigenous and black women, for example, have been accused of contributing to urban crime for birthing uneducated and poor children. This type of discrimination has contributed to these women being more affected by processes of urban gentrification and neighborhood deterioration and have been submitted to forced sterilization.

Historically, cities have also offered women more freedom than rural communities. The options available to women are higher in cities due to their inherent demographic heterogeneity, size, and market-driven focus.

=== Decision-making and design of urban space ===
Built environments are said to reflect the values of the societies that built them. However, in industrial and post-industrial civilizations, built environments are often more a manifestation of the values specifically of the people with the power to build them. Jane Darke, a feminist geographer, writes that “any settlement is an inscription in space of the social relations in the society that built it, our cities are patriarchy written in stone, brick, glass and concrete.” The built environment has a level of permanence and durability that if done conservatively can represent ideas that are no longer in line with the values and needs of the current communities. The commodification of space can also give place to a built environment that does not acknowledge, respond, or respect the historical, cultural, and social influence of a specific place, and thus buildings play an important role in normalizing or promoting inequality. The buildings and infrastructure that define our cities have a direct and significant influence in the way people live their lives and the choices that are available to them.

Cities are designed and planned by architects, urban planners, engineers, and policy makers, fields that have historically been dominated by men. Thus, women have lacked representation and participation in the planning of urban space. According to the Women in Architecture department of the American Institute of Architects, as of 1958 only 1% of registered architects were women. In 1999, the number had grown to 13.5%. As of 2020, only 17% of registered architects are women. Women in the field continue to face challenges, such as being excluded from leadership positions. Social geographer Liz Bondi argues that “simply adding women to the profession” will not necessarily mean that patriarchal systems are being challenged. Women in the fields of design and planning can still enforce patriarchal systems, often because how strongly these are embedded in our culture and professional education. Biases in the research done by the field are also generated by “citational reliability,” where articles are for the most part written and influenced by a strict typology of middle-aged white men. Moreover, the inclusion of women in the field and as imagined users of urban environments have also been disproportionate across race, social status, and sexual orientation.

Feminist urbanism establishes that cities have been designed based on a generalization of users, a focus on the nuclear family and a concept of neutral design. Architecture has also based itself on the ideal of gender as binary and has supported the traditional gender roles that take men as the main users of the city. Both concepts are increasingly not representative of the realities of contemporary societies. Major assumptions on behavioral patterns and a focus on planning taking as a typical urban citizen a white, heterosexual, able-bodied, middle-income man has produced spaces that ignore the needs of other groups. Women experience the city with physical, economic, and social barriers that are either gendered or not adequate for their unique set of needs. Inés Sánchez de Madariaga argues that recognizing women as urban individuals and understanding the key differences in the way they experience daily life in cities (in comparison to men) is an important step to achieve just and equitable urban environments.

== Theory ==
Theories of feminist urbanism, study the historical causes and impacts of female exclusion from urban environments, urban scholarship, design, and decision-making. The theories also present the different ways in which urban environments pose barriers for women to live prosperous, independent, and balanced lives, while also acknowledging the increased opportunities and freedoms cities can provide for women. The theory of feminist urbanism is derived from the ideas of feminism.

=== The commons ===
The commons is a theory and socio-economic movement that opposes capitalist and patriarchal ideals of property and labor, in favor of a socialist collaboration among communities to meet the responsibilities of housework and care-work. Commons in the context of Feminist urbanism refers to shared spaces and shared resources. Urban farming, community gardens, childcare facilities and shared kitchens are some examples of these types of spaces that allow for different forms of cooperation and collaboration in basic daily activities. The theory proposes embracing the local culture and resources, rejecting a universalization of space or policy, by rather adapting these to the needs of different communities.

Matthew Desmond has written about how communities of distressed neighborhoods in Milwaukee helped each other with payments, errands, and other emergencies, more so than communities in wealthier neighborhoods. These exchanges of favors elevated the stability of community members and created an environment that was much more caring and “human”. However, Desmond notes that communities that had experienced trauma would be less likely to engage in collaborative actions to improve their quality of life. He notes: “A community that saw so clearly its own pain had a difficult time also sensing its potential.”

The commons theory is often associated to a movement away from private ownership and commodities to the extent in which they start to divide and alienate our spaces and our communities. In her book, Re-Enchanting the World: Feminism and the Politics of the Commons, Silvia Federici defines the commons or commoning as a “collective re-appropriation and collective struggle against the ways we have been divided” and as a practice of “putting more and more of your life outside the reaches of commodification or extraction.” She argues that living in a world driven by competition and individual prosperity at the expense of others is a recipe for defeat. Capitalism in the context of quality of life, has failed to provide an equalitarian access to resources and has not met the basic needs of many populations, leaving them in vulnerable economic, political, and social contexts. Federici argues that the commons can be a way to oppose capitalism by working together as a mode of survival and prosperity.

This theory, in recent years, has become popular in conversations about climate change as shared resources and spaces are ways to reduce waste, increase density and promote more green, sustainable, walkable, and accessible spaces for all.

=== Housing ===
In the United States, at the end of the nineteenth century, millions of immigrants that lived in industrial cities started to move to suburbs that offered better living conditions. After World War II, suburban life boomed, especially among white middle-income families, with the aid of Federal Housing Administration loans and VA mortgages that made single-family homes in these periphery areas much more affordable. White flight also played an important role in this movement of whites to the suburbs as black families moved from the South to Northern cities. Suburbs were excessively marketed by developers as prefabricated affordable neighborhoods perfect for nuclear families, in which men worked and women took care of domestic work. Betty Friedan called this assumption of women being fulfilled only by housework and childcare the “feminine mystique”.

These housing developments were predominantly car dependent, alienated from commercial spaces, economic centers, and other services, which increased the difficulty of managing housework and professional demands. Consequently, this strict separation of housing from labor opportunities and services set the stage for a more dramatic gender division of labor. Women were unable to easily access labor opportunities, engage in political lives or socialize beyond their immediate surroundings. Today, the housing typologies of suburbs remain, but do not adequately respond to the realities of heterogenous families and contemporary lives.

Most cities provide more opportunities for women to meet the multiplicity of demands put on them in terms of accessing services in shorter distances than suburbs or rural areas do. However, often cities are not built for care-work activities, and pose multiple barriers for women's mobility, safety, and equal access to spaces. For example, housing in cities can be much more expensive, especially in walkable areas and public transportation without proper amenities can prevent families from moving comfortably. In addition, the lack of spaces for childcare in offices can prevent people from balancing work and parenthood demands. A lot of the solutions to respond to urban problems have been market-based, requiring extra pay to access convenient services such as childcare, safe housing or neighborhood amenities. In addition, urban apartments still struggle to respond to the changing needs of families.

Housing both in urban and suburban environments can be more equalitarian by responding to the needs of families for affordable, accessible, sustainable, and well-networked services, that allow men and women to participate equally in the sharing of domestic and professional labor. Bringing care-work to the forefront of urban design and making services accessible by distance and diverse transportation networks can improve the quality of life of urban families and is an important way to promote equal access to resources and opportunities for all genders. Dolores Hayden argued that a new, more inclusive way of designing and thinking of homes, neighborhoods and cities is necessary to support the activities of employed women. To transform housing, Hayden establishes that men and women need to be equally involved in paid and unpaid labor, housing segregation by class, race, age and other factors has to be eliminated, unpaid domestic labor and waste has to be minimized, and choices for recreation, social activities and basic needs have to be maximized. In addition to this, housing developments need to apply the theory of the commons to offer collective spaces. Finally, all services need to be accessible through well-designed walking networks and complemented by other infrastructure needs such as shading systems, seating, and public restrooms.

In The Grand Domestic Revolution, Hayden outlines multiple projects since the 1800s that have looked to socialize housework and encourage collaboration in domestic environments.

=== Urinary leash ===
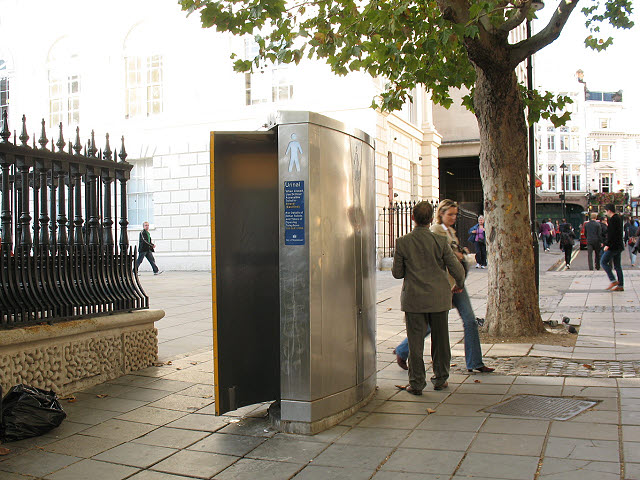
A public urinal designed for use while standing, most women would not feel safe or able to use it.

The urinary leash is a feminist concept that relates to women's equitable use of cities. Many buildings were created with only men's restrooms, especially those in spaces that were entirely male at the time such as certain college classrooms, doctor's lounges, and pilot's offices creating a form of segregation. This caused a need for women to separate themselves from the group or return home every time they had to use the restroom. This is related to women's needs for period supplies, spaces they feel comfortable breastfeeding, places babies or children are welcome, and places that are free from harassment. More broadly, decisions that may seem neutral such as adding a "no bag policy" to a music venue may exclude women through a variety of factors such as sanitary needs, beauty standards relating to makeup, and a lack of pockets in women's clothing.

== Major advocates and resources ==
=== People ===
- Amy Dunckel Graglia
- Ana Falú
- Angela Davis
- Anna Puigjaner
- Audrey Lorde
- bell hooks
- Charlotte Brontë
- Dolores Hayden
- Elizabeth Wilson
- Ellie Cosgrave
- Fabiola Lopez Duran
- Hannah Arendt
- Holly Bruce
- Jane Jacobs
- Jane Adams
- Jeanne Van Heeswijk
- Jill Valentine
- Leslie Kern
- Maria Mies
- Maria Sheherazade Giudici
- Melassina Fey Pierce
- Michelle Buckley
- Patricia Hill Collins
- Rosario Talevi
- Silvia Federici
- Tovi Fenster
- Yardena Tankel

=== Publications and organizations ===
- City: Rediscovering the Center by William H. Whyte
- Women in Urbanism Aotearoa
- Women Transforming Cities
- Miami Girls Foundation

== See also ==
- Bicycling and feminism
- Urbanism
- Urban theory
- Urban vitality
- Victim blaming
