= Wout van Heusden =

Dutch graphic artist (1896–1982)

Wouter Bernard (Wout) van Heusden (25 September 1896 in Rotterdam – 9 July 1982 in Rotterdam) was a Dutch graphic artist, who also worked as etcher, lithographer, manufacturer of woodcuts, painter, draftsman, and painters.

Van Heusden attended evening art classes in graphic techniques at the Academie voor Beeldende Kunsten (now Willem de Kooning Academy) in Rotterdam, and kept living and working in Rotterdam-Zuid. Aside from a few brief trips to Paris and Munich, he barely left his part of the city. Initially he locally made a name as a painter of portraits and still lifes. His still lifes often have a surreal character and fits into the magic realism and surrealism. Later, his graphic work prevailed, initially lithographs, and later only etching. Hereby he developed a unique technique with aquatint, which contrasted with lines, in which a magical, dreamlike atmosphere was recalled.

In 1946 Van Heusden and Koos van Vlijmen founded the artist group Vrije Beelden (Free Images), and among others Piet van Stuivenberg jointed their group. In 1962 Van Heusden was given a major retrospective exhibition at the Museum Boijmans Van Beuningen, which was followed by other museum exhibitions. Meanwhile, Van Heusden remained studiously out of the spotlight (being called "the Hermit of Tuindorp"), and he participated with colleagues and galleries. At the end of his life he was a little more accessible. His paintings, which he exhibited after 1962 were generally less acclaimed than his etchings, probably because they were significantly different from what was usual.

Van Heusden was awarded the Sambre Award in 1959, the Rembrandt Award in 1966, and the Hendrik Chabot Award for his graphics in 1968. The city of Rotterdam granted him Wolfert Borsele Penning in 1975. His work is present in the MoMA collection.

He had also worked as a photographer; in an edition of the photomagazine "Focus", dated 3 October 1959 he explained in an article he wrote, about how he became a photographer.
