= Leonard Freed =

American photojournalist (1929–2006)

- Born: October 23, 1929; Brooklyn, New York
- Died: November 29, 2006 (aged 77); Garrison, New York
- Known for: Photography

Leonard Freed (October 23, 1929 – November 29, 2006) was an American documentary photojournalist and longtime Magnum Photos member.

== Career ==
Freed had wanted to be a painter, but began taking photographs in the Netherlands and discovered a new passion. He traveled in Europe and Africa before returning to the United States where he attended The New School and studied with Alexey Brodovitch, the art director of Harper's Bazaar. In 1958 he moved to Amsterdam to photograph its Jewish community. Through the 1960s he continued to work as a freelance photojournalist, traveling widely. He documented the Civil Rights Movement in America (1964–1965), the Yom Kippur War in 1973, and the New York City police department (1972–1979). His career blossomed during the American civil rights movement, when he traveled the country with Martin Luther King Jr. in his celebrated march across the U.S. from Alabama to Washington. This journey gave him the opportunity to produce the book Black in White America (1968), which brought considerable attention. His work on New York City law enforcement also led to a book, Police Work (1980).

Early in Freed's career, Edward Steichen purchased three photographs from him for the collection of the Museum of Modern Art. In 1967, Cornell Capa selected Freed as one of five photographers to participate in his Concerned Photography exhibition. Freed joined Magnum Photos in 1972. Publications to which he contributed over the years included Der Spiegel, Die Zeit, Fortune, Libération, Life, Look, Paris-Match, Stern, and The Sunday Times Magazine of London.

In later years, Freed continued photographing in Italy, Turkey, Germany, Lebanon and the U.S. He also shot four films for Japanese, Dutch and Belgian television.

Freed's work was included in the 2025 exhibition Photography and the Black Arts Movement, 1955–1985 at the National Gallery of Art.

== Personal life ==
Freed was born October 23, 1929, in Brooklyn, New York to Jewish, working-class parents of Eastern European descent. In 1956 he met Brigitte Klück, who became his wife, while on assignment for Look in Rome. They had a daughter, Elke Susannah. Freed died in Garrison upstate New York of prostate cancer on November 29, 2006.

== Publications ==
- Joden van Amsterdam, Netherlands: De Bezige Bij, 1958.
- Deutsche Juden Heute, Germany: Rütten u. Loening, 1965.
- Black in White America, United States: Grossman Publishers, 1967. California: Getty Museum, 2010; ISBN 978-1-60606-011-7
- Seltsame Spiele, Germany: Bärmeier u. Nikel, 1970.
- Leonard Freed’s Germany, London: Thames and Hudson, 1971. ISBN 978-0-500-54004-6
- Made in Germany, USA: Grossman, 1970. Penguin, 1971. ISBN 978-0-670-44564-6
- Berlin, New York City: Time-Life, 1977.
- Police Work, USA: Simon and Schuster, 1980; ISBN 978-0-670-44563-9. Holiday House, 1981; ISBN 978-0-671-25202-1
- La Danse des Fidèles, France: Chêne, 1984.
- New York Police France: (Photo Notes), Centre national de la photographie, 1990. ISBN 978-2-86754-064-6
- Leonard Freed: Photographs 1954-1990, UK: Cornerhouse/Nathan, 1991. New York City: W. W. Norton, 1992. ISBN 978-0-393-03350-2
- Amsterdam: The Sixties, USA: Focus Publishing, 1997. Netherlands: Uitgeverij Focus, 1997. ISBN 978-90-72216-50-2
- Another Life, Netherlands: ABP Public Affairs, 2004.
- Leonard Freed: Worldview with William Ewing, Wim van Sinderen, Nathalie Herschdorfer. Lausanne: Musée de l'Élysée, 2007. ISBN 978-3-86521-463-8
- Indonesiers in Holland, Netherlands: d'Jonge hond, 2009. Note: This publication is misnamed as the people being photographed are actually Indo people, not "Indonesiers" (English: Indonesians)
- This Is the Day: The March on Washington, Los Angeles: Getty Publications, 2013; ISBN 978-1-60606-121-3

== Films ==
- Joey Goes to Wigstock (1993) – color, 10'

== Awards ==
- New York State Grant for the Arts, 1978
- National Endowment for the Arts, 1980

== Collections ==
Important segments of Freed's work are available to the public in the following collections:

- Museum of Modern Art, New York City: 9 prints
- Davidson Art Center, Wesleyan University, Middletown, CT
