= Axel en Helena van der Kraan =

Dutch artist

Axel en Helena van der Kraan were a sculptor-duo from the Netherlands, consisting of Axel van der Kraan (born 1949) and Helena van der Kraan-Maazel (1940–2020), active as sculptors and draftsman.

== Live and work ==
They lived and worked together in Rotterdam since 1987. In 1989, they were awarded the Hendrik Chabot Award. In 1990, at the Museum Boymans Van Beuningen, there was a retrospective of their work with sculptors, drawings, and photography.

Helena van der Kraan-Maazel died 14 June 2020 (her 80th birthday) in Rotterdam from cancer. She was described as an artist, who "observed with a concerned look, who recorded her surroundings in noiseless portraits."

According to Henny de Lange, Helena van der Kraan mainly sought with her photography "the beauty of the everyday."

=== Exhibitions, a selection ===
- 1978. Galerie Espace, Amsterdam.
- 1989. Museum Boymans-Van Beuningen.

=== Works in public space ===
- 1989, Schillepaard van de Schilderswijk, The Hague
- 1999, Keteltje, Wormerveer
- 2006, De Smid, Barendrecht
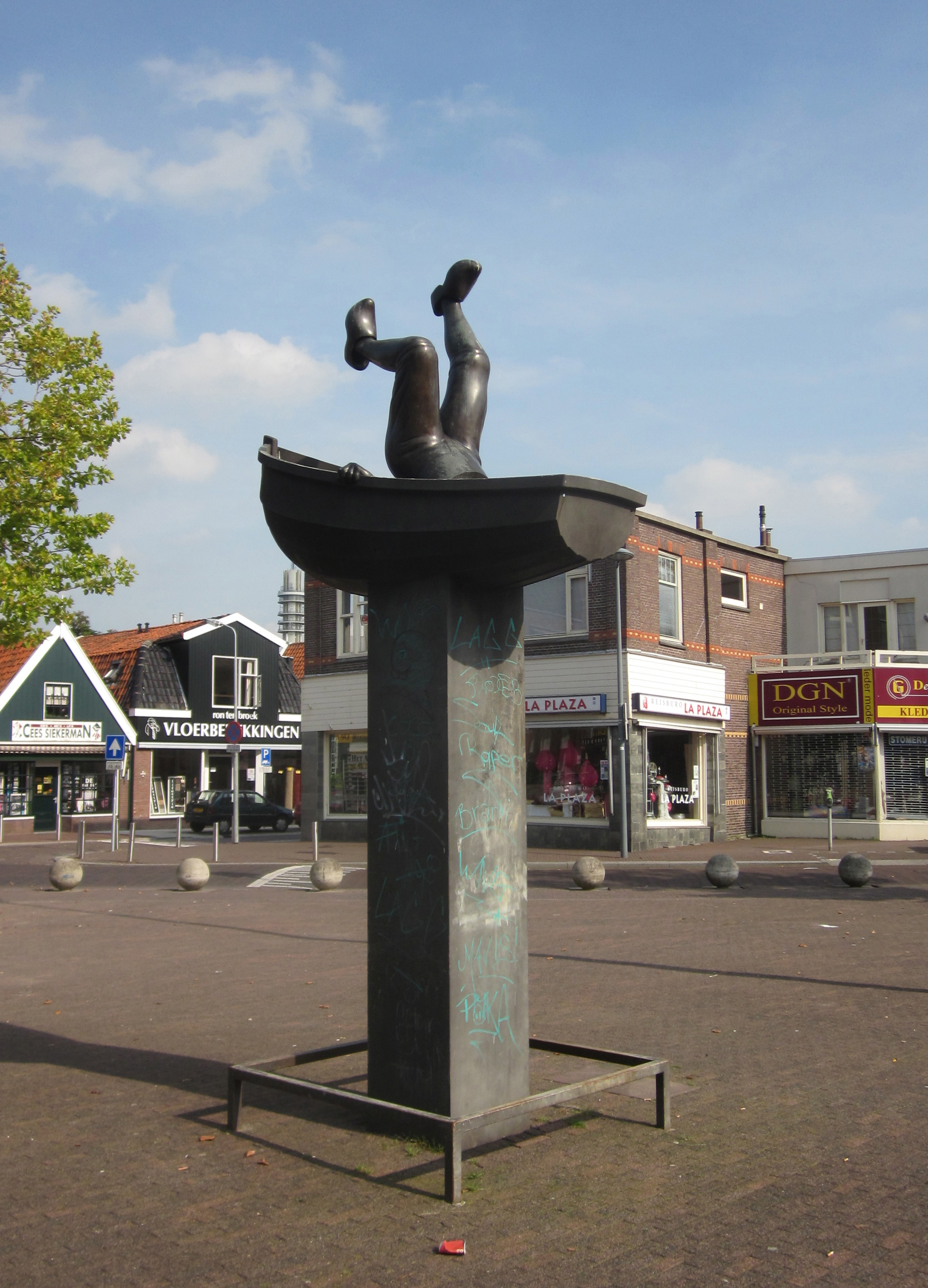
Keteltje in Wormerveer

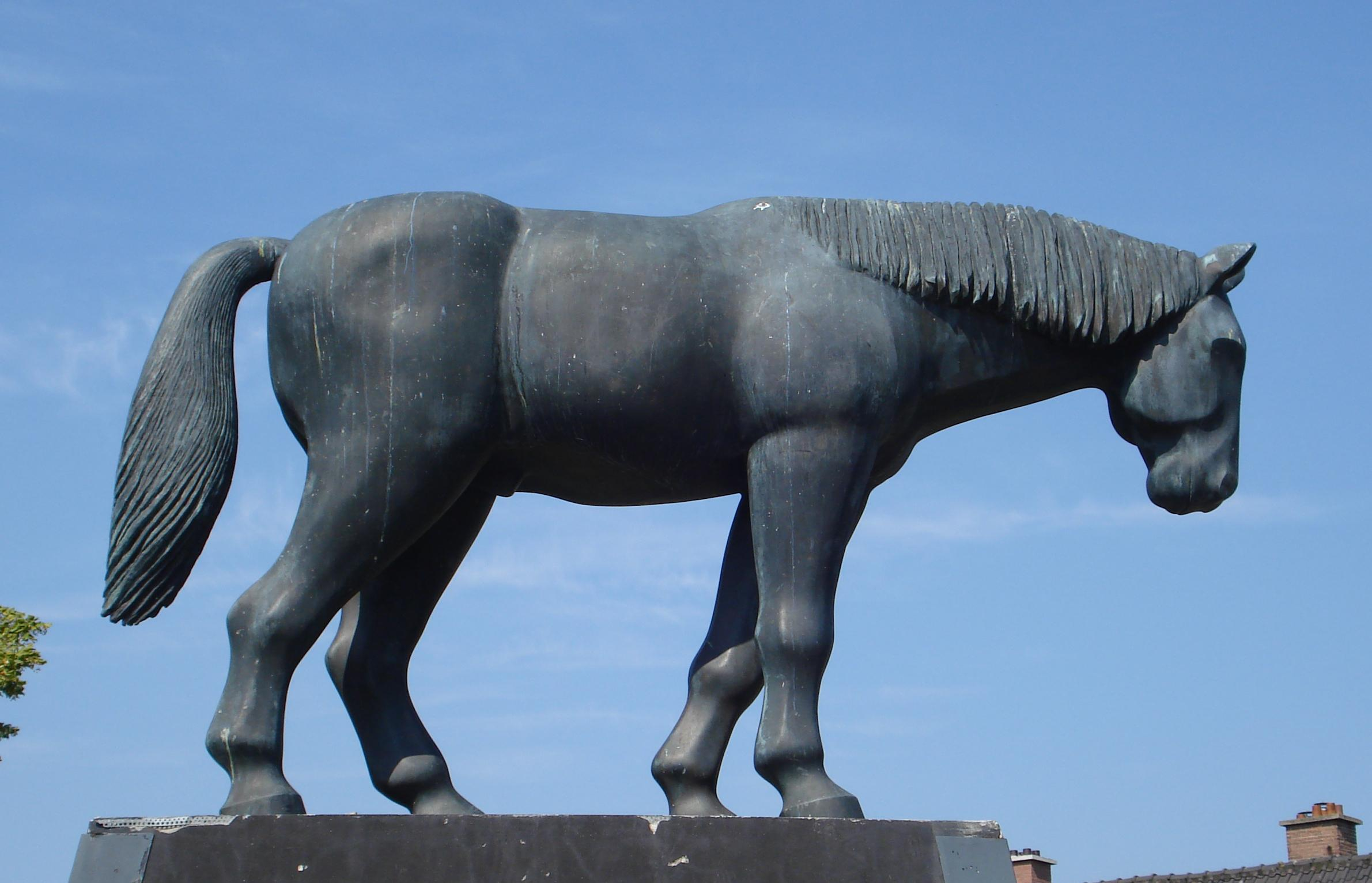
Schillepaard van de Schilderswijk

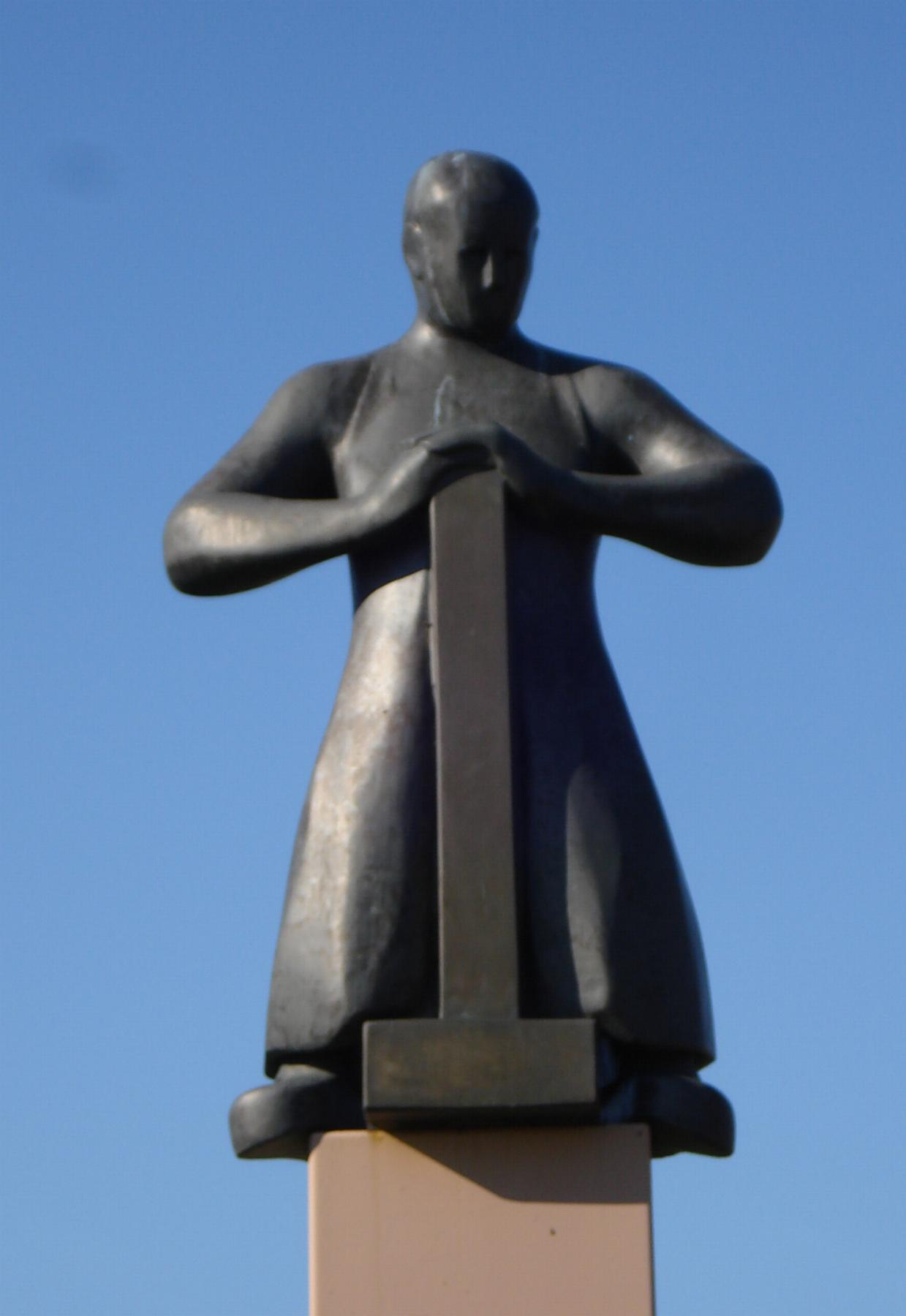
De Smid, Barendrecht
