= Edgar Krahn =

Estonian mathematician (1894–1961)

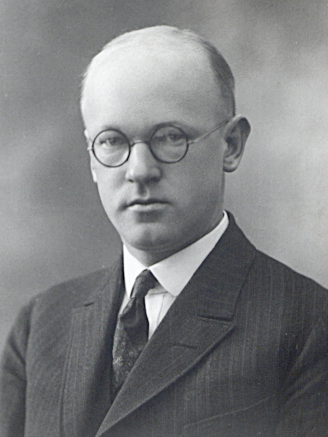
- Born: 1 October 1894; Laiuse, Estonia
- Died: 6 March 1961 (aged 66); Rockville, Maryland, United States
- Known for: Rayleigh–Faber–Krahn inequality

Academic background
- Education: University of Tartu (1918); University of Göttingen (1926)

Academic work
- Discipline: Mathematics

Edgar Krahn (1 October [O.S. 19 September] 1894 – 6 March 1961) was an Estonian mathematician. Krahn was born in Sootaga (now Laiuse, Jõgeva County), Governorate of Livonia, as a member of the Baltic German minority. He died in Rockville, Maryland, United States.

Krahn studied at the University of Tartu and the University of Göttingen. He graduated at Tartu in 1918, received his doctoral degree at Göttingen in 1926, with Richard Courant as his advisor, and his habilitation took place at Tartu in 1928. He is co-author of the Rayleigh–Faber–Krahn inequality.

Krahn worked in Estonia, Germany, the United Kingdom, and the United States in the following areas of pure and applied mathematics:

- Differential geometry
- Differential equations
- Bausparmathematik, which is distantly related to insurance mathematics
- Probability theory
- Gas dynamics
- Elasticity theory

== See also ==
- List of Baltic German scientists
