= Fotomuseum Den Haag =

Fotomuseum, The Hague
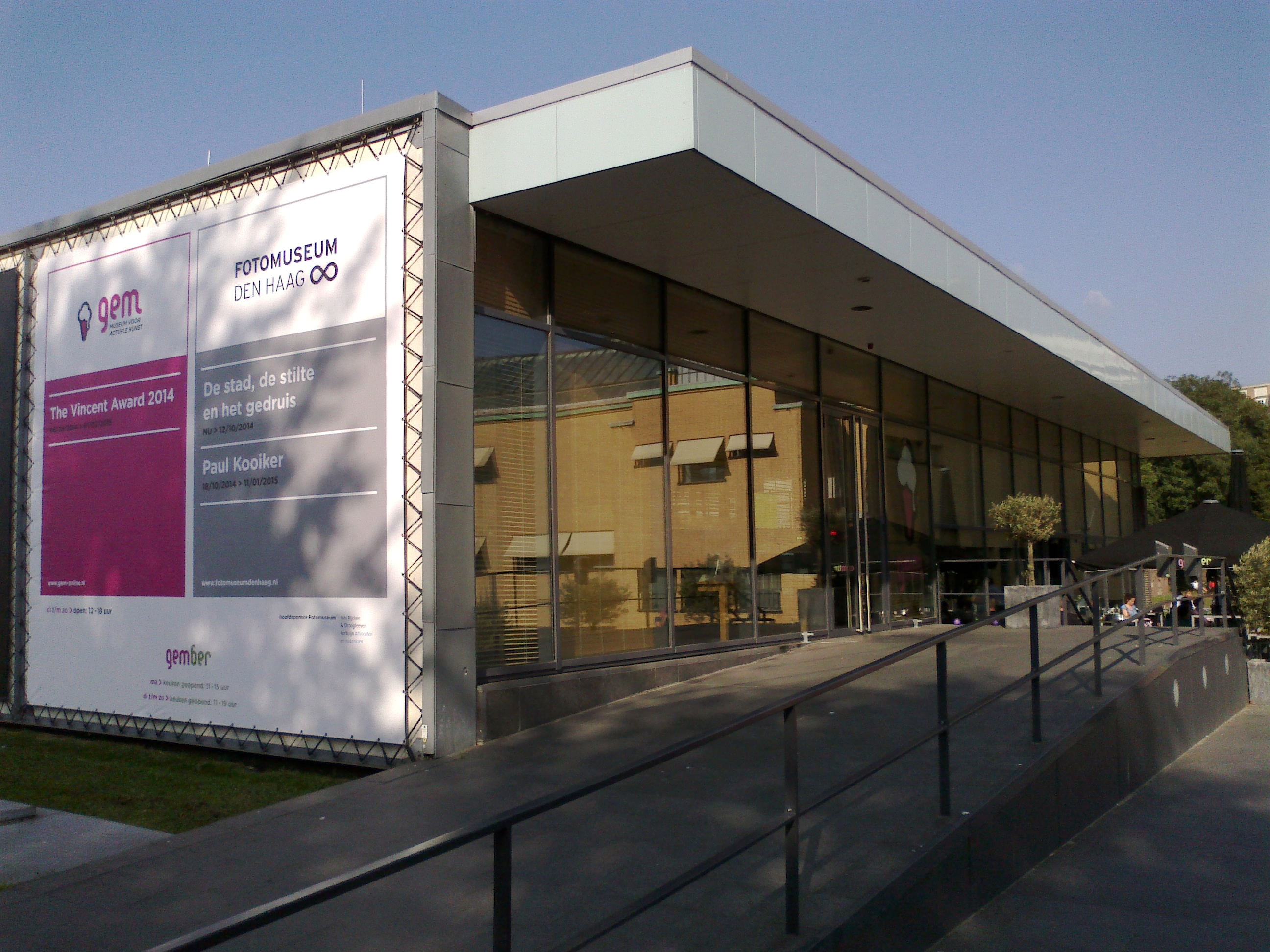
- Entrance KM21 and Museum for Photography, The Hague

- Location in South Holland in the Netherlands
- Established: 2002
- Location: Stadhouderslaan 43; The Hague, Netherlands
- Coordinates: 52°5′26″N 4°16′47″E
- Type: Art museum
- Director: Margriet Schavemaker
- Website: www.km21.nl

The Fotomuseum Den Haag (The Hague Museum of Photography) is a photography museum in The Hague. The museum was founded in 2002. It was a spin-off of the nearby Kunstmuseum Den Haag, when then director Wim van Krimpen decided that the Kunstmuseum's collection of photography had become so rich that it deserved a separate location. It shares an entrance and space with the museum of contemporary art KM21.

== Building ==
The museum is located next to the Kunstmuseum The Hague in the Schamhart Wing designed by the architects Sjoerd Schamhart and J.F. Heijligers. This exhibition wing was built in 1961-2 as an extension of the then called Haags Gemeentemuseum. It was updated for the launch of the Fotomuseum in 2002 by the architectural firm of Benthem Crouwel.

The Foto Museum was expanded from 400 to 1,000 square meters in 2016, taking over more space from the then-called GEM for contemporary art museum, also located in the building. This created the opportunity and space, in addition to the work of established names in the photography world, to show smaller historical exhibitions and the work of promising emerging talent.

== Exhibitions ==
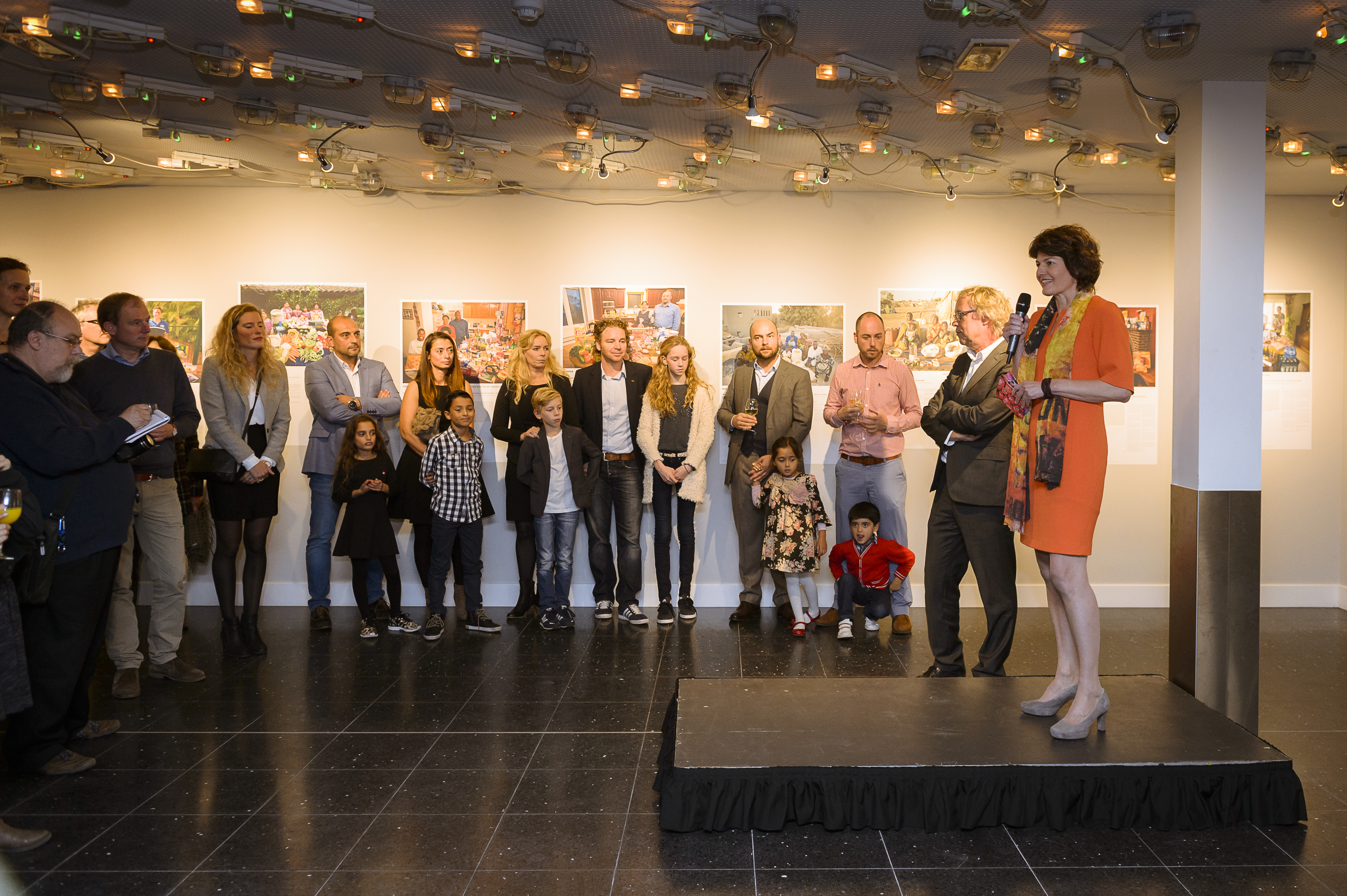
Opening of the exhibition Hungry Planet in 2015 about photographer Peter Menzel at the ground floor of the museum.

Each year, the Fotomuseum Den Haag organizes approximately six exhibitions from a range of periods, disciplines and genres of photographic history.

Exhibitions alternate contemporary photographers, such as Desiree Dolron, Loretta Lux and Gregory Crewdson, with overviews of historic photographers such as Emmy Andriesse, Edward S. Curtis and Leonard Freed. In 2025 the museum presented Enter the Cube, a site-specific installation by Marleen Sleeuwits in dialogue with the work of Sol LeWitt.

Underexposed and unknown reputations and oeuvres are prominently presented, such as those of Gerard Fieret, Willem van de Poll and the Dutch years of fashion photographer Erwin Blumenfeld.

Socially relevant photo projects by contemporary photographers are regularly shown, such as the series on the International Criminal Tribunal for the former Yugoslavia by Friso Keuris, the sexual relations between older people by Marrie Bot or the primeval landscapes threatened by man by Anja de Jong.

== Annual Photo Prize ==
From 2006 to 2015, the museum was associated with an annual photo prize: the Silver Camera for press photography in the Netherlands. In the period 2009 to 2013, the Photo Academy Award was also associated with the Fotomuseum Den Haag.

== Organization ==
The Fotomuseum The Hague is part of the Kunstmuseum, along with the museum for contemporary art KM21. As of 2024, the director is Margriet Schavemaker, replacing Benno Tempel. In 2023, (together with KM21) it received 61,052 visitors, and increase on the 2022 number of 50,010.
