= Desiree Dolron =

Dutch photographer

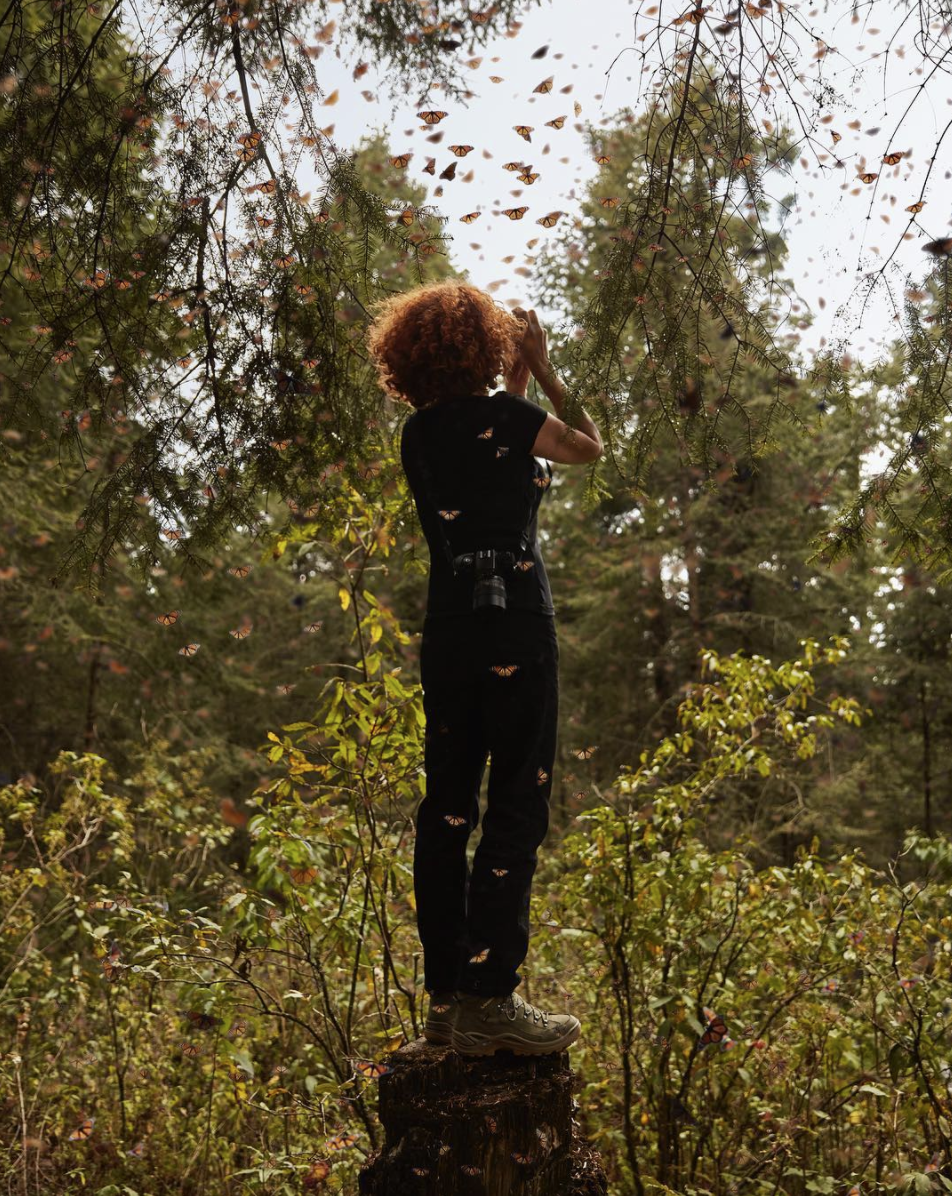
- Desiree Dolron while working on her series Monarch (2018)
- Born: 16 April 1963 (age 62); Haarlem, the Netherlands
- Known for: Photography, Film maker, Visual Artist
- Notable work: 'Xteriors (2001-2018), Te di todos mis suenos
- Awards: Prix de Rome (1996), Artist of the Year (2019)

Desiree Dolron (born 16 April 1963) is a Dutch visual artist who lives and works in Amsterdam, the Netherlands. Her photographs portray a variety of styles and subjects, including documentary photography, still life, portraits and video works. Dolron is best known for her series Xteriors (2001-2018).

== Early life ==
Dolron was born in Haarlem, the Netherlands.

== Work ==
Dolron has traveled extensively to find subjects for her photography. One of Dolron's ongoing series is titled Xteriors, which consists of photographic portraits drawn from the style of paintings by Old Masters.

== Publications ==
- Stranded, 1990. Amsterdam: Design by Mevis & Deursen, Binded by André van der Zalk. This Volume contains eighteen selenium toned silver prints. The book was produced in an edition of ten.
- Religion and Death 1992/1992, Amsterdam: Published by Alexander Valeton Design by Mevis & Deursen, Binded by André van der Zalk ISBN 9074346022
- Exaltation - Images of Religion and Death, Publisher DDH Foundation, Text by Manfred Heiting, Laurens ten Kate, Kees Fens & Joop de Jong, Designed by Mevis & Van Deursen ISBN 9080260827
- Desirée Dolron 2005. Publisher Terra Lannoo in conjunction with the retrospective exhibition 'Desiree Dolron' in the Hague Museum of Photography, design Maarten Evenhuis kindly supported by Michael Hoppen Gallery. ISBN 90 5897 348 4
- Desirée Dolron 2006. Publisher Éditions Xavier Barral, essays by Pierre Assouline, Mark Haworth-Booth. Accompanied the exhibition Exaltation-Gaze-Exteriors at The Institut Néerlandais. ISBN 2-915173-15-X
- Xteriors 2017, Publisher Raven Foundation Amsterdam, Design by Irma Boom essays by Wim Pijbes and Charlotte Cotton ISBN 9789081700108

== Selected solo exhibitions ==
- 1993 Desiree Dolron, De Nederlandsche Bank, Amsterdam
- 1994 Selected Works, Galerie Serieuze Zaken, Amsterdam, Religion and Death, Kunsthal, Rotterdam
- 1995 Desiree Dolron, Aschenbach Gallery. Amsterdam Silence of the Eye, RijksMuseum, Public space, Amsterdam Desiree Dolron, Stedelijk Museum het Domein, Sittard
- 1998 Behind the Eye, Groninger Museum, Groningen Gaze, Flatland Gallery, Utrecht
- Photographie, Arles Exaltation, Fototeca, Havana, Cuba
- 2001 Xteriors, Loerakker Gallery, Amsterdam
- 2002 Statement, Paris Photo, Paris. Te dí todos mis Sueños, Loerakker Gallery, Amsterdam Desiree Dolron, Les Rencontres Internationales de la Photographie, Arles Exaltation, Fototeca, Havana, Cuba
- 2003 Te dí todos mis sueños, Michael Hoppen Gallery, London
- 2004 Xteriors, Michael Hoppen Gallery, London
- 2005 Retrospective, Fotomuseum Den Haag, Den Haag
- 2006 Desiree Dolron, Exaltation, Gaze, Xteriors, Instituut Néerlandais, Paris
- 2007 Hotel California, Wallraf-Richartz-Museum & Foundation Corboud, Köln
- 2009 Desiree Dolron, Fotografins Hus, Stockholm
- 2010 Desiree Dolron, Fototeca de Cuba, Havana
- 2013 Desiree Dolron, Solo presentation, Art Basel, Hong Kong
- 2015 Desiree Dolron, Solo for Grimm at Paris Photo L.A.
- 2016 I will show you fear in a handful of dust, RavenFoundation, Amsterdam
- 2017 Forever Someone Else, GRIMM, Amsterdam, Desiree Dolron, A Retrospective, Singer Museum, Laren
- 2018 Complex Systems, GRIMM, NY

== Collections ==
- Stedelijk Museum het Domein, Sittard
- Museum for Religious Arts, Uden
- Groninger Museum, Groningen
- Gemeentemuseum Den Haag, The Hague
- Stedelijk Museum, Amsterdam
- The Museum of Fine Arts, Houston
- Victoria & Albert Museum, London
- Museo Reina Sofia, Madrid
- Solomon R. Guggenheim Museum, New York
- Joseph M. Cohen collection
- National Museum of Qatar

== Awards ==
Dolron was awarded the Laureate Prix de Rome, Amsterdam, the Netherlands (1996).
