= Bik van der Pol =

Artists

Bik van der Pol is the artists duo Liesbeth Bik and Jos van der Pol, who work together since 1994 as conceptual artists and installation artists.

The artists started in 1994-95 in Rotterdam, where they worked ever since. In 1999 they were residences of the P.S.1 Contemporary Art Center in New York and in 2011 in residence at the Bard College. In 2014 Bik Van der Pol was awarded the Hendrik Chabot Award for Visual Arts by the Prins Bernhard Cultuurfonds South Holland.

== Selected exhibitions and projects ==
- 1996. Manifesta 1 in Rotterdam.
- 2005: Secession, Vienna
- 2007: Xth Istanbul Biennale; Fly Me To The Moon, Rijksmuseum, Amsterdam
- 2008: Becoming Dutch, Van Abbe Museum, Eindhoven
- 2008/2009: Plug In 28, Pay Attention, Act 1, 2, 3, Van Abbe Museum, Eindhoven
- 2009: It isn't what it used to be and will never be again, CCA Glasgow; Xth Lyon Bienniale, Lyon
- 2010: Are you really sure a floor can't also be a ceiling? ENEL Award 2010, Macro museum, Rome
- 2011: Living As Form, Creative Time, New York; Accumulate, Collect, Show, Frieze Projects, Frieze Art Fair, London;
- 2012: You talking to me? 98Weeks (Beirut, Lebanon); Between a Rock and a Hard Place, Sudbury (Ca), Musagetes
- 2013: 25 years City Collections, Museum Boymans van Beuningen Rotterdam, Biennale of Mercosul, Porto Alegre, Brazil, Call of the Mall, project for Hoog Catarijne, Utrecht, CAPACETE entretenimentos ROAD/BOAT 3.1.8 at the school Xapomi, Amazon, Brazil
- 2014: Public art project, Ternitz (Austria), 31st São Paulo Bienale, São Paulo; Museum of Arte Util, Van Abbe Museum, Eindhoven; The Crime Was Almost Perfect*, Witte de With Centre for Contemporary Art, Rotterdam, Apex Art, Decolonised Skies, NYC, CAFA Art Museum, The Missing Stories, Beijing, The Part In The Story, Witte de With Centre for Contemporary Art, Rotterdam, The Crime was almost Perfect, PAC Padiglione d'Arte Contemporanea. Milano
- 2015: The Power Plant, Toronto (Can); PAMM (Perez Art Museum) Miami, Jakarta Biennale, Mauritius Pavilion, Venice Bienal; Future Light, MAK, Vienna; Decolonized Skies, ADNPlatform, Barcelona
- 2016: Were It As If, Witte de With, Centre of Contemporary Art, Rotterdam; SEMA, Media City Biennale, Seoul; 11th GwangJu Biennale, GwangJu
- 2017:Verschwindende Vermächtnisse: Die Welt als Wald - Disappearing Legacies: The World as Forest, Zoological Museum of CeNak, University of Hamburg, Hamburg

Offshore: artists explore the sea, Ferens Art Gallery, Hull. Greater Together Greater Together, ACCA, Melbourne Youth Academy THE CITY & THE CITY, Academie der Kunste der Welt, Cologne

- 2018: Mama, was ist eigentlich Natur? Kunstmuseen Krefeld

Headlands, research residency (fall 2018) Take Part, project for Public Knowledge, with SFMOMA and Public Libraries network, San Francisco (fall 2018) Verschwindende Vermächtnisse: Die Welt als Wald - Disappearing Legacies: The World as Forest, Zentralmagazin Naturwissenschaftliche Sammlungen, Halle Dismantling the Scaffold, curated by Christina Li, Tai Kwun Contemporary, JC Contemporary, Hong Kong Verschwindende Vermächtnisse: Die Welt als Wald - Disappearing Legacies: The World as Forest, Tieranatomische Teater, Berlin

- 2019: Czigane – Not the whole story, Royal Albert Memorial Museum (RAMM), Exeter. U.K

Whole Life Academy, HKW/Archive der Avantgarde, Dresden. Far Too Many Stories to Fit Into so Small a Box, CCA Zamek Ujazdowski, Warsaw, research and exhibition Take Part, project for Public Knowledge, with SFMOMA and Public Libraries network, San Francisco (January–April 2019) Czigane – Not the whole story, Royal Albert Memorial Museum (RAMM), Exeter Whole Life Academy, HKW/Archive der Avantgarde, Dresden. Far Too Many Stories to Fit Into so Small a Box, CCA Zamek Ujazdowski, Warsaw, research and exhibition Take Part, project for Public Knowledge, with SFMOMA and Public Libraries network, San Francisco (January–April 2019)

== Selected publications ==
- Bik van der Pol, Henry Moore Institute (Leeds, England), Catching some air: library drawings by Bik Van der Pol, 2002. Essays by Penelope Curtis, Lunda Morris. ISBN 190008158X
- Bik van der Pol, With Love From The Kitchen. Published by nai010 publishers. Essays by Jan Verwoert, Jean Attali, Wouter Davidts, Charles Esche, Mary Jane Jacob and Sven Lütticken.
- Bik van der Pol: Past Imperfect Paperback – 2005. Publisher: Secession / Revolver (2005) ISBN 390192678X Essays by Nina Montmann, Arnon Grunberg, Susanne Neuburger, Hedwig Saxenhuber.
- Bik Van Der Pol: Casco Issues: Past Imperfect No. 9 2006. ISBN 3865882188
- Bik Van der Pol . (2011), Elements of Composition: (as Above, So Below).
- Bik Van der Pol & 98weeks (2012). You Talking to Me?: Bik Van Der Pol & 98weeks, Beirut.
- Bik Van der Pol, Fly Me to the Moon. Texts by Jennifer Allen, Wouter Davidts, Frans Von der Dunk, Bik Van der Pol, Jane Rendell ISBN 978-1-933128-20-7
- Bik Van der Pol Istanbul 59 Locations (A Format For Nightcomers) 2007 Text by Bik Van der Pol, Pelin Tan.
- Bik Van der Pol Public Arena 2009, Design by David Bennewidth.
- Bik Van der Pol, Up & Close Publication by Witte de With 2014. https://issuu.com/wittedewith/docs/rch2newspaper.
- Bik Van der Pol & Urban Subjects, "Learning from Vancouver" 2010.
- Bik Van der Pol It isn't what it used to be and will never be again published by CCA Glasgow. 2010. Essays by Jan Verwoert, Francis McKee, Bik Van der Pol.
- Bik Van der Pol Moderna Museet Projekt 2000. Text by Maria Lind, Nicholas Bourriaud. ISBN 9171006478
- Bik Van der Pol " Between a Rock and a Hard Place". Published by Musagetes 2012. http://musagetes.ca/wp-content/uploads/2014/06/Between-a-Rock-and-a-Hard-Place-Publication.pdf
- Bik Van der Pol "Are you sure a floor can't also be a ceiling?" ENEL 2010. Published by ENEL.
- Bik Van der Pol What if the moon was just a jump away? http://www.bikvanderpol.net/files/book/i_5099/bikvanderpol.pdf
- Bik Van der Pol What if the moon was just a jump away. Published by Jan Van Eyck Academy. ISBN 978-90-812018-0-3
- Bik Van der Pol/ Defne Ayas; Where It As If. Published by Witte de With 2017. ISBN 978-94-91435-49-2. https://www.wdw.nl/en/our_program/publications/were_it_as_if
