= Hendrik Chabot Award =

Dutch art award

The Hendrik Chabot Award (Dutch: Hendrik Chabot Prijs) is an annual award for visual artists presented by the Prins Bernhard Cultuurfonds, section South Holland. The prize ceremony is in the city hall of Rotterdam, where the prize is given by The Mayor of Rotterdam and the King's Commissioner in the province. The reward is named after the Rotterdam artist Hendrik Chabot (1894 – 1949).

== Award winners, a selection ==
- Kees Timmer (1903–1978), 1966
- Piet van Stuivenberg, 1967
- Wout van Heusden, 1968
- Mathieu Ficheroux, 1969
- Jan van Munster, 1971
- Ton van Os, 1974
- Hans Verweij, 1978
- Daan van Golden and Paul Beckman, 1987
- Ian Jacob Pieters, 1988
- Axel en Helena van der Kraan, 1989
- Charly van Rest, 1991
- Ine Lamers, 1995
- Joep van Lieshout, 1997
- Co Westerik, 1999
- Jeanne van Heeswijk, 2002
- Dré Wapenaar, 2005
- Wendelien van Oldenborgh, 2011
- Bik Van Der Pol, 2014

== See also ==
- List of European art awards
