= Caroline Walker (artist) =

Scottish-born contemporary visual artist

- Born: 1982 (age 43–44); Dunfermline
- Education: Glasgow School of Art; Royal College of Art
- Movement: Feminist Art Movement

Caroline Walker (born 1982) is a Scottish-born contemporary visual artist based in London. She is known for voyeuristic paintings of women working.

Walker was born in Dunfermline.

== Education ==
Walker obtained a bachelor's degree in painting from Glasgow School of Art. She earned her master's degree from Royal College of Art in London.

== Work ==
Walker used to imagine scenes and hire models to depict them. She took photographs and would use them as a source in constructing oil paintings. In 2016, she began looking in London streets for anonymous subjects in natural settings.

Walker captures intimate moments of women's lives. She is known for realistic paintings of women at work. She highlights overlooked jobs — such as in nail bars, salons, hotels, the household etc. — which are performed by women. There is a variety of socio-economic status among her subjects.

Walker's works make the viewers feel like voyeurs, as her subjects are seen from a vantage point through windows, bannisters or from a certain height. Her works are often large, making it easy for the viewer to imagine stepping into the scene.

Walker's art is often painterly. Colour is an important element for her so as to evoke a painting's aura or ambience.

Walker's work is held in collections such as the Pérez Art Museum Miami, and the Institute of Contemporary Art, Miami, both in Florida. She was elected to the Royal Scottish Academy in 2024.

From 22 November 2025 – 26 April 2026, Walker's work was shown in the exhibition Caroline Walker: Mothering at the Pallant House Gallery, Chichester, United Kingdom.

== Selected works ==
- Pool Party (2013)
- Pampered Pedis (2016)
- Training (2017)
- Apparition (2017)
- Not Going Out (2017)
- Three Maids (2018)
- Abi (2018)
- Making Fishcakes (2019)
- Bathroom Sink Cleaning (2019)
- Planting Decisions (2019)
- Sewing (2019)
- Drafting (2019)
