= Rayleigh–Faber–Krahn inequality =

Spectral Geometry Phenomenon

In spectral geometry, the Rayleigh–Faber–Krahn inequality, named after its conjecturer, Lord Rayleigh, and the two individuals who independently proved the conjecture, G. Faber and Edgar Krahn, is an inequality concerning the lowest Dirichlet eigenvalue of the Laplace operator on a bounded domain in $\mathbb{R}^n$, $n \ge 2$. It states that the first Dirichlet eigenvalue is no less than the corresponding Dirichlet eigenvalue of a Euclidean ball having the same volume. Furthermore, the inequality is rigid in the sense that if the first Dirichlet eigenvalue is equal to that of the corresponding ball, then the domain must actually be a ball. In the case of $n=2$, the inequality essentially states that among all drums of equal area, the circular drum (uniquely) has the lowest voice.

More generally, the Faber–Krahn inequality holds in any Riemannian manifold $M$ which satisfies the same sharp isoperimetric inequality as a complete simply connected space form of constant sectional curvature. In particular, if the Cartan–Hadamard conjecture holds, then the Faber–Krahn inequality should also hold in all simply connected manifolds of nonpositive curvature.

== See also ==
- Hearing the shape of a drum
