= List of Dutch sculptors =

This is a list of Dutch sculptors who were born and/or were primarily active in the Netherlands.

== A ==
- Johannes Josephus Aarts (1871–1934)
- Per Abramsen (1941–2018)
- Cris Agterberg (1883–1948)
- Woody van Amen (1936)
- Mari Andriessen (1897–1979)
- Karel Appel (1921–2006)
- Lucien den Arend (1943)
- Armando (1929–2018)
- Cornélie Caroline van Asch van Wijck (1900–1932)

== B ==
- Nina Baanders-Kessler (1915–2002)
- Gijs Bakker (1942)
- Joost Baljeu (1925–1991)
- Hanneke Beaumont (1947)
- Joop Beljon (1922–2002)
- Fons Bemelmans (1938)
- Boris Van Berkum (1968)
- René de Boer (1945)
- Marinus Boezem (1934)
- Gerrit Bolhuis (1907–1975)
- Jan van Borssum Buisman (1919–2012)
- Loek Bos (1946)
- John Boxtel (1930–2022)
- Eugène Brands (1913–2002)
- Clemens van den Broeck (1943)
- Hugo Brouwer (1913–1986)
- Willem Coenraad Brouwer (1877–1933)
- Coosje van Bruggen (1942–2009)
- Dirk Bus (1907–1978)

== C ==
- Gerard Caris (1925–2025)
- Jules Chapon (1914–2007)
- Constant (1920–2005)
- Cornelius Cure (died 1607)

== D ==
- Cor Dam (1935–2019)
- Ad Dekkers (artist) (1938–1974)
- Jan Dekkers (1919–1997)
- Jan Dibbets (1941)
- Theo Dobbelman (1906–1984)
- Dora Dolz (1941–2008)
- Jan van Druten (1916–1993)
- César Domela (1900–1992)
- Lydeke von Dülmen Krumpelmann (1952)
- Toon Dupuis (1877–1937)
- Maïté Duval (1944-2019)

== E ==
- Dick Elffers (1910–1990)
- Ger van Elk (1941–2014)
- Ron van der Ende (1965)
- Piet Esser (1914–2004)
- Charles Eyck (1897–1983)

== F ==
- August Falise (1875–1936)
- Mathieu Ficheroux (1926–2003)
- Chris Fokma (1927–2012)
- Frederick Franck (1909–2006)

== G ==
- Lotti van der Gaag (1923–1999)
- Paulus Joseph Gabriël (1784–1833)
- Guido Geelen (1961)
- Jan van Gemert (1921–1991)
- Nikolaus Gerhaert (c. 1420–1473)
- Hubert Gerhard (c. 1540/1550–1620)
- Grinling Gibbons (1648–1721)
- Marijke de Goey (1947)
- Gert van Groningen (died c. 1577)
- Dick de Groot (1920–2019)
- Greet Grottendieck (1943)
- Klaas Gubbels (1934)

== H ==
- Piet van Heerden (1924–1996)
- Berend Hendriks (1918–1997)
- Vilma Henkelman (1944)
- Folke Heybroek (1913–1983)
- Jeroen Henneman (1942)
- Chris van der Hoef (1875–1933)
- Derk Holman (1916–1982)
- Pieter d'Hont (1917–1997)
- Romeyn de Hooghe (1645–1708)
- Theo van der Horst (1921–2003)
- Bart van Hove (1850–1914)

== I ==
- Aart van den IJssel (1922–1983)
- Bon Ingen-Housz (1881–1953)

== J ==
- Teunis Jacob (1927–2009)
- Theo Jansen (1948)
- Frederik Engel Jeltsema (1879–1971)
- Folkert de Jong (1972)
- Hans de Jong (1932–2011)

== K ==
- Niek Kemps (1952)
- Mathieu Kessels (1784–1836)
- Hendrick de Keyser (1565–1621)
- The Kid (1991)
- Peter Klashorst (1957)
- Job Koelewijn (1962)
- David van de Kop (1937–1994)
- Huub Kortekaas (1935)
- Axel en Helena van der Kraan (1940s)
- Hildo Krop (1884–1970)
- Ruud Kuijer (1959)

== L ==
- Joep van Lieshout (1963)
- Johan Limpers (1915–1944)
- Ignatius van Logteren (1685–1732)
- Jan van Logteren (1709–1745)

== M ==
- Hans 't Mannetje (1944–2016)
- Hannie Mein (1933–2003)
- Friedrich Wilhelm Mengelberg (1837–1919)
- Liesbeth Messer-Heijbroek (1914–2007)
- Frank de Miranda (1913–1986)
- Leonard van Munster (1972)

== N ==
- Barbara Nanning (1957)
- Herman Nieweg (1932–1999)
- Pepijn van den Nieuwendijk (1970)

== P ==
- Charlotte van Pallandt (1898–1997)
- Pier Pander (1864–1919)
- Theresia van der Pant (1924–2013)
- Gerrit Patist (1947–2005)
- Jan van de Pavert (1960)
- Lon Pennock (1945–2020)
- Eugène Peters (1946)
- Godfried Pieters (1936)
- Joop Puntman (1934–2013)

== R ==
- John Rädecker (1885–1956)
- Marcus Ravenswaaij (1925–2003)
- Theo van Reijn (1884–1954)
- Lia van Rhijn (1953)
- Jan de Rooden (1931–2016)
- Louis Royer (1793–1868)
- Gerda Rubinstein (1931–2022)

== S ==
- Don Satijn (1953)
- Sjra Schoffelen (born 1937)
- Louise Schouwenberg (1953)
- Lara Schnitger (1969)
- Wolff Schoemaker (1882–1949)
- Q.S. Serafijn (1960)
- Claus Sluter (1340s–1405/06)
- Anno Smith (1915–1990)
- Kees Smout (1876–1951)
- Jan Snoeck (1927–2018)
- Henk Stallinga (1962)
- Niel Steenbergen (1911–1997)
- Frans van Straaten (1963)
- Piet van Stuivenberg (1901–1988)

== T ==
- Shinkichi Tajiri (1923–2009)
- Henri Teixeira de Mattos (1865–1908)
- Willem Danielsz van Tetrode (1530–1587)
- Kees Timmer (1903–1978)
- Aert van Tricht (c. 1492 to 1501–1550)

== V ==
- Hans Van de Bovenkamp (1938), Dutch born American sculptor
- Jan van der Vaart (1931–2000), ceramist
- Gerrit van der Veen (1902–1944)
- Thierry Veltman (1939–2023)
- Rombout Verhulst (1624–1698)
- Kees Verkade (1941–2020)
- Kees Verschuren (1941)
- Tomasz Vetulani (1965)
- Rob Voerman (1966), Dutch graphic artist, sculptor and installation artist

== W ==
- Oswald Wenckebach (1895–1962)
- Claus de Werve (c. 1380–1439)
- Jan Wolkers (1925–2007)
- Ans Wortel (1929–1996)
- Anton van Wouw (1862–1945)

== X ==
- Jan Baptist Xavery (1697–1742)

== Z ==
- Cornelis Zitman (1926–2016)
- Izaak Zwartjes (1974)

== See also ==
- List of Dutch ceramists
- List of sculptors
- List of Dutch painters
