= Pippin =

Pippin or Pepin may refer to:

== Arts and entertainment ==
- Pippin (comics), a children's comic produced from 1966 to 1986
- Pippin (musical), a Broadway musical by Stephen Schwartz loosely based on the life of Pepin the Hunchback
  - Pippin (original cast recording), a 1972 album containing a recording of the musical made by its original 1972 Broadway cast
- Pippin Took, character from The Lord of the Rings
- Pippin, dog from 1993 children’s TV show Come Outside
- The Short Reign of Pippin IV, a novel by John Steinbeck

== People ==
- Pepin of Landen (c. 580–640), nicknamed the Elder, sometimes listed as a saint
- Pepin of Herstal (c. 635 – 714), nicknamed the Middle
- Pepin the Short or Pippin the Younger (c. 714 – 768), father of Charlemagne
- Pepin the Hunchback (c. 769 – 811), first son of Charlemagne
- Pepin of Italy (777–810), second son of Charlemagne, born Carloman and later named Pepin
- Pepin I of Aquitaine (797–838), grandson of Charlemagne, son of Louis the Pious
- Pepin II of Aquitaine (823–864), son of Pepin I of Aquitaine
- Pepin, Count of Vermandois (817–850), grandson of Pepin of Italy
- Pippin (name), given name and surname, including Pepin

== Places ==
- Pepin, Iran, a village in Mazandaran Province, Iran
- Pepin Island, New Zealand
- Pepin County, Wisconsin, U.S.
  - Pepin (town), Wisconsin
    - Pepin, Wisconsin, a village near the town
- Lake Pepin, Minnesota, U.S.
- Pepin Township, Wabasha County, Minnesota, U.S.

== Others ==
- Apple Pippin, multimedia technology platform
- Cincinnati Pippins, a team in the United States Baseball League
- Pépin's test to determine whether a Fermat number is prime in mathematics
- Pippin (roller coaster), earlier version of Kennywood's Thunderbolt roller coaster that opened in 1924
- Pippin apple, a kind of apple, any of several cultivars, sometimes referred to as pippin
- Yakima Valley Pippins, American baseball team
- Zippin Pippin, a roller coaster

== See also ==
- Saint Pepin (disambiguation)
- Pippen
