= Pepijn =

Pepijn is the Dutch form of the masculine given name Pippin. Before the 1960s, the name was rarely used in the Netherlands, but it has become quite popular since the turn of the century. As a patronymic surname, it appears to be extinct in Belgium and the Netherlands. People with the name include:

== Given name ==
- Pepijn Aardewijn (born 1970), Dutch rower
- Pepijn Bijsterbosch (born 1989), Dutch motorcycle racer
- Pepijn Caudron (born 1975), Belgian composer and producer known as "Kreng"
- Pepijn van Erp (born 1972), Dutch mathematician and skeptic
- Pepijn Lijnders (born 1983), Dutch football manager
- Pepijn van den Nieuwendijk (born 1970), Dutch painter and ceramist
- Don Pepijn Schipper (born 1980), Dutch DJ known as "Don Diablo"
- Pepijn Veerman (born 1992), Dutch footballer

== Surname ==
- Katharina Pepijn (1619–1688), Flemish painter
- Marten Pepijn (1575–1643), Flemish painter
