= Pippig =

Pippig is a surname. Notable people with the surname include:

- Regina Pippig (born 1947), German sprinter
- Uta Pippig (born 1965), German long-distance runner

== See also ==
- Pippin (name), given name and surname
