= Pipping =

Pipping may refer to:

- Pipping (animal behavior), the process of breaking open an eggshell using an egg tooth
- Pipping (crime), any intentional unauthorized absence from compulsory schooling
- Pipping, a Finnish noble family

== See also ==
- Pippin (disambiguation)
- Pipe (disambiguation)
