= Jan Dekkers =

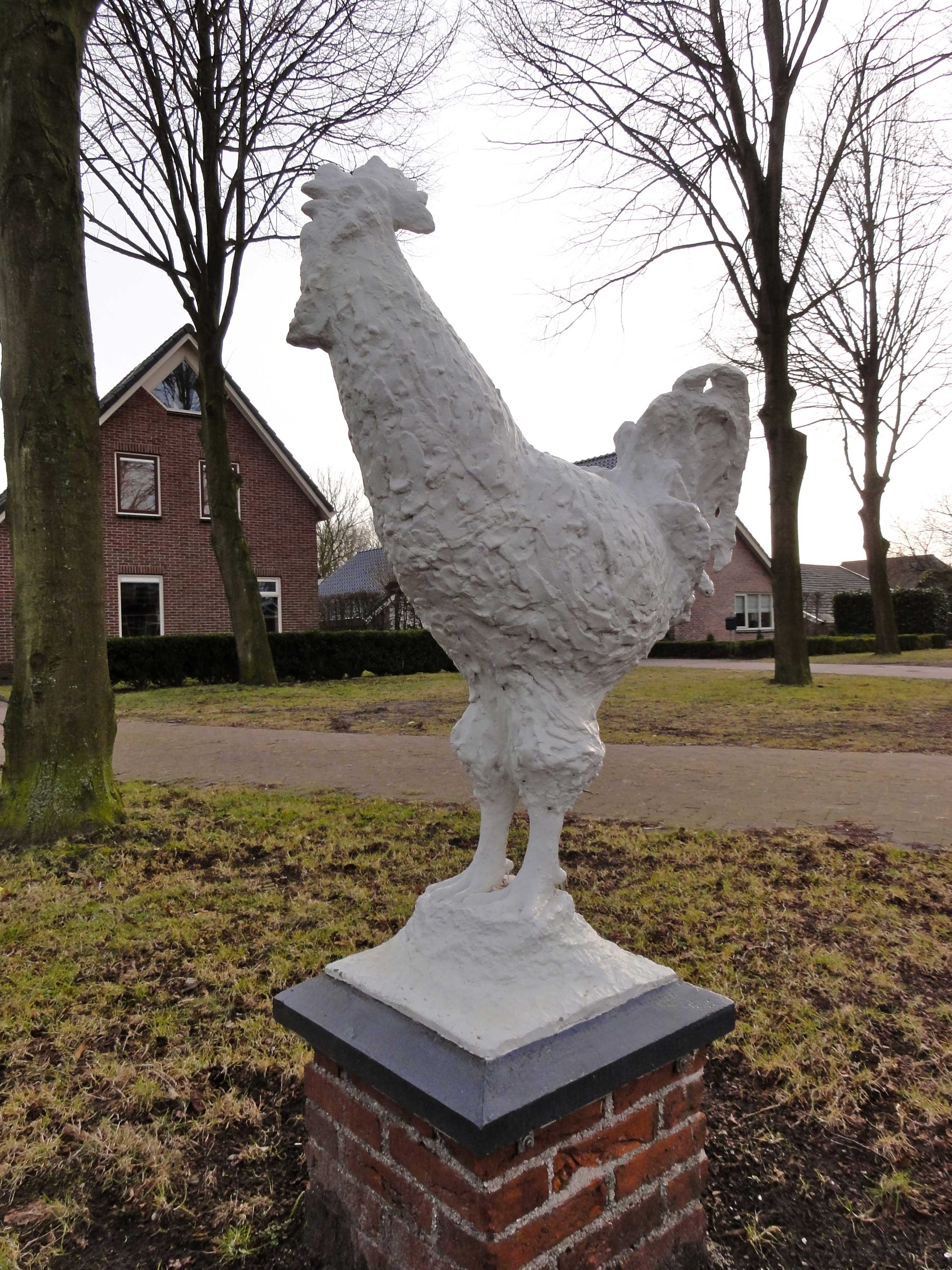
"Rooster" in Gieterveen.

Johannes Cornelis Josephus Marie (Jan) Dekkers (Breda, 15 April 1919 – Gieterveen, 21 January 1997), was a Dutch painter, designer and sculptor.

== Life and work ==
Jan Dekkers studied at the Jan van Eyck Academy in Maastricht, where he was taught by Joep Nicolas. As an artist he was engaged in painting, stained glass work, ceramics drawing and making sculptures. He was also active as an illustrator among others for the Utrecht Nieuwsblad. In 1963 he made sixty drawings for the book Groningen, stad en gewest ("Groningen, city and province") by A. Boerma.

Dekkers lived and worked from 1964 to 1969 in Bremen, and then settled in the province of Drenthe in Gieterveen.

In the municipality of Aa en Hunze there are three images of his hand made of cement.

Dekkers has never exhibited his work during his lifetime. In 2004/2005 the Veenkoloniaal Museum in Veendam had an exhibition of his work. On this occasion the publication "Jan Dekkers and his work" appeared.

In August 2011 in Gieterveen and Gieten there was an art trail along his work, with the church in Gieterveen exhibiting special works of Dekkers.

== Selected works ==
- Hippie Couple - Old Groningerweg, Casting
- Speech is silver, silence is golden - Eexterweg, Casting
- "Rooster" - Pants, Gieterveen
- The Thinker - Brink, Casting
- Stained glass window Dekelhem - Bodde Field, Casting

== See also ==
- List of Dutch sculptors
