= Lydeke von Dülmen Krumpelmann =

Dutch sculptor and ceramist

Lydeke von Dülmen Krumpelmann (born Groningen, 24 August 1952) is a Dutch sculptor and ceramist.

Von Dülmen Krumpelmann is the daughter of artist Erasmus Herman von Dülmen Krumpelmann and illustrator Marieke Eisma. She started working as a ceramist in 1972. She made the prizes for the Northern International Concours hippique Zuidlaren, and the gift to the parting of the King's Commissioner in the province of Drenthe Tineke Schilthuis and Ad Oele in 1982 and 1989.

The work of von Dülmen Krumpelmann is particularly inspired by the world of the animal. She is a member of the Drenthe Painting Association, established by her father Erasmus Herman and grandfather Erasmus Bernhard Dulmen Krumpelmann.

== See also ==
- List of Dutch sculptors
- List of Dutch ceramists
