= Derk Holman =

Dutch sculptor and ceramist

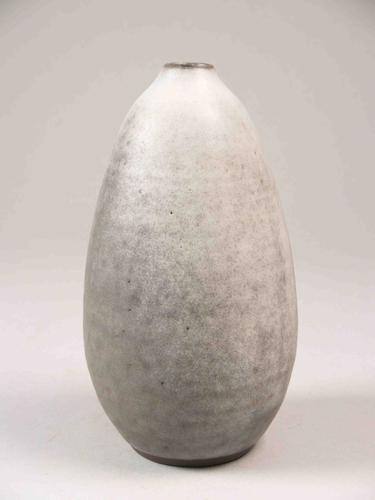
Elongated bulbous vase with glaze in shades of gray and brown accents by Derk Holman, 1961

Derk Holman (August 14, 1916, in Buitenpost – February 27, 1982, in Groningen) was a Dutch sculptor and ceramist.

== Life and work ==
Holman was the son of an architect. He received his training at the Minerva Academy in Groningen from 1934 to 1937. During his training he was primarily engaged in sculpture and painting, and later experimented with pottery.

Holman lived and worked in Grootegast, and sold most of his products himself traveling on his ship through the Netherlands. Holman made a number of sculptures and wall sculptures of resin stone, that were placed in the public space.

Holman often made use of earthy tones and knew his work to provide smooth surfaces with crystal glaze. From the fifties he decorated his work with abstracted motifs and geometric patterns.

== Works (selection) ==
- ca. 1965 Children playing, Biddinghuizen.
- 1968 Living water (tiled mosaic), Assen.
- 1969/1970 Children with a dog, Nijverdal.
- 1970 Sandpit, Lelystad.
- 1970 Narrative, Dronten.
- 1970 Shepherd, Emmen.
- 1971 Eagles, Beilen.
- 1971 Children playing, Emmeloord.
- 1971 Security, Grootegast.

== See also ==
- List of Dutch ceramists
- List of Dutch sculptors
