= Dick Elffers =

Dutch artist

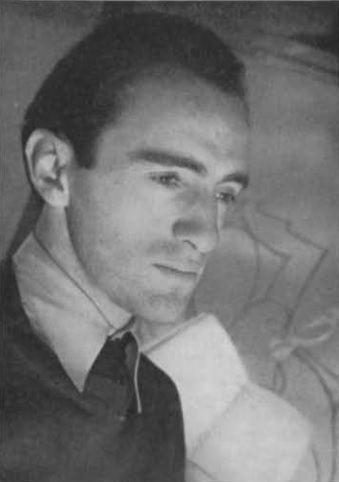
- Born: Dirk Cornelis Elffers; 9 December 1910; Rotterdam, the Netherlands
- Died: 17 June 1990 (aged 79); Amsterdam, the Netherlands
- Known for: Painting
- Spouse: Emmy Andriesse

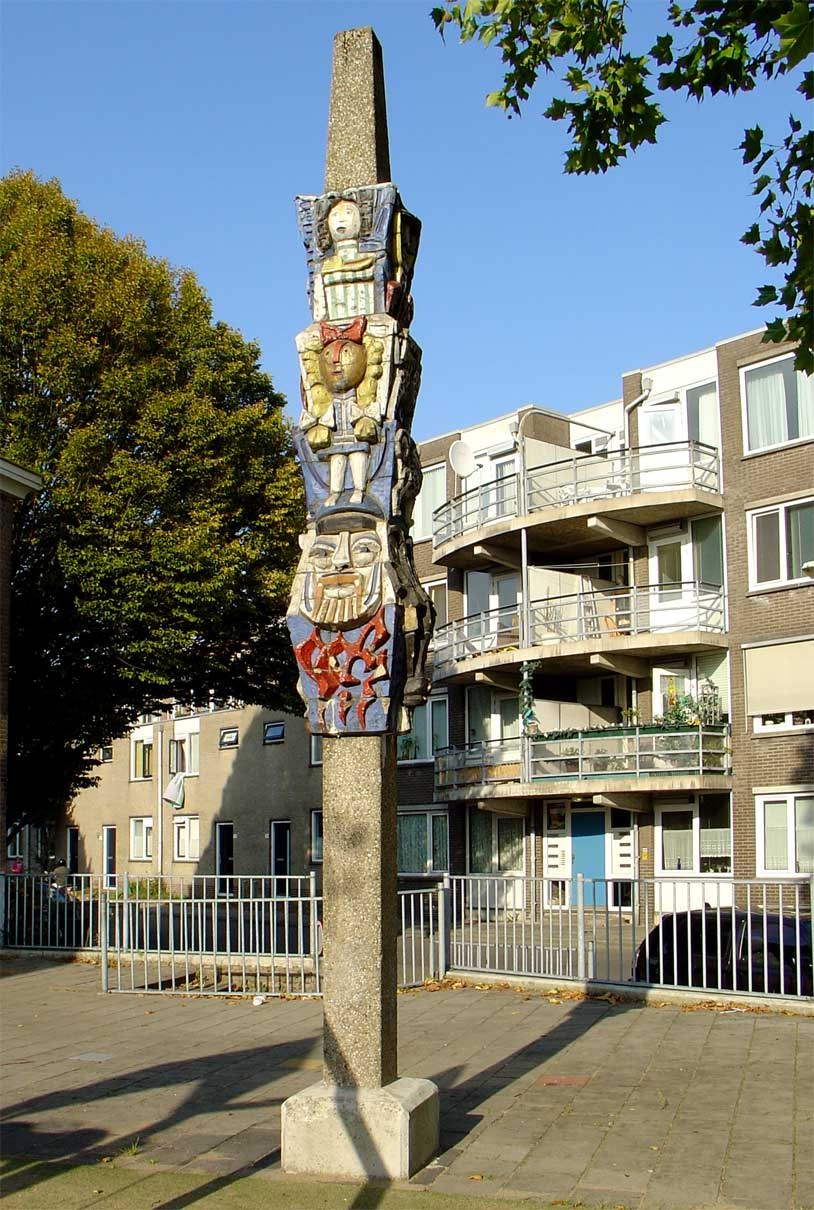
Totem Pole by Elffers in Gouda.

Dirk Cornelis "Dick" Elffers (Rotterdam, 9 December 1910 – Amsterdam, 17 June 1990) was a Dutch artist.

== Life ==
Elffers was trained at the Academie voor Beeldende Kunsten (Rotterdam) as graphic designer. During this time, he also helped designers Paul Schuitema and Piet Zwart. Besides performer from 1970 to 1976 he was lecturer in monumental art at the AKV St. Joost in 's-Hertogenbosch. Elffers received the State Award for Typography for his typographic work. Elffers' work is included in the collection of the Joods Historisch Museum. Elffers was also involved as a designer at the Rijksmuseum Amsterdam.

Elffers' work was included in the 1939 exhibition and sale Onze Kunst van Heden (Our Art of Today) at the Rijksmuseum in Amsterdam.

== Family ==
Elffers hasa a brother named Joost Elffers.

== See also ==
- List of Dutch ceramists
- List of Dutch sculptors
