= David van de Kop =

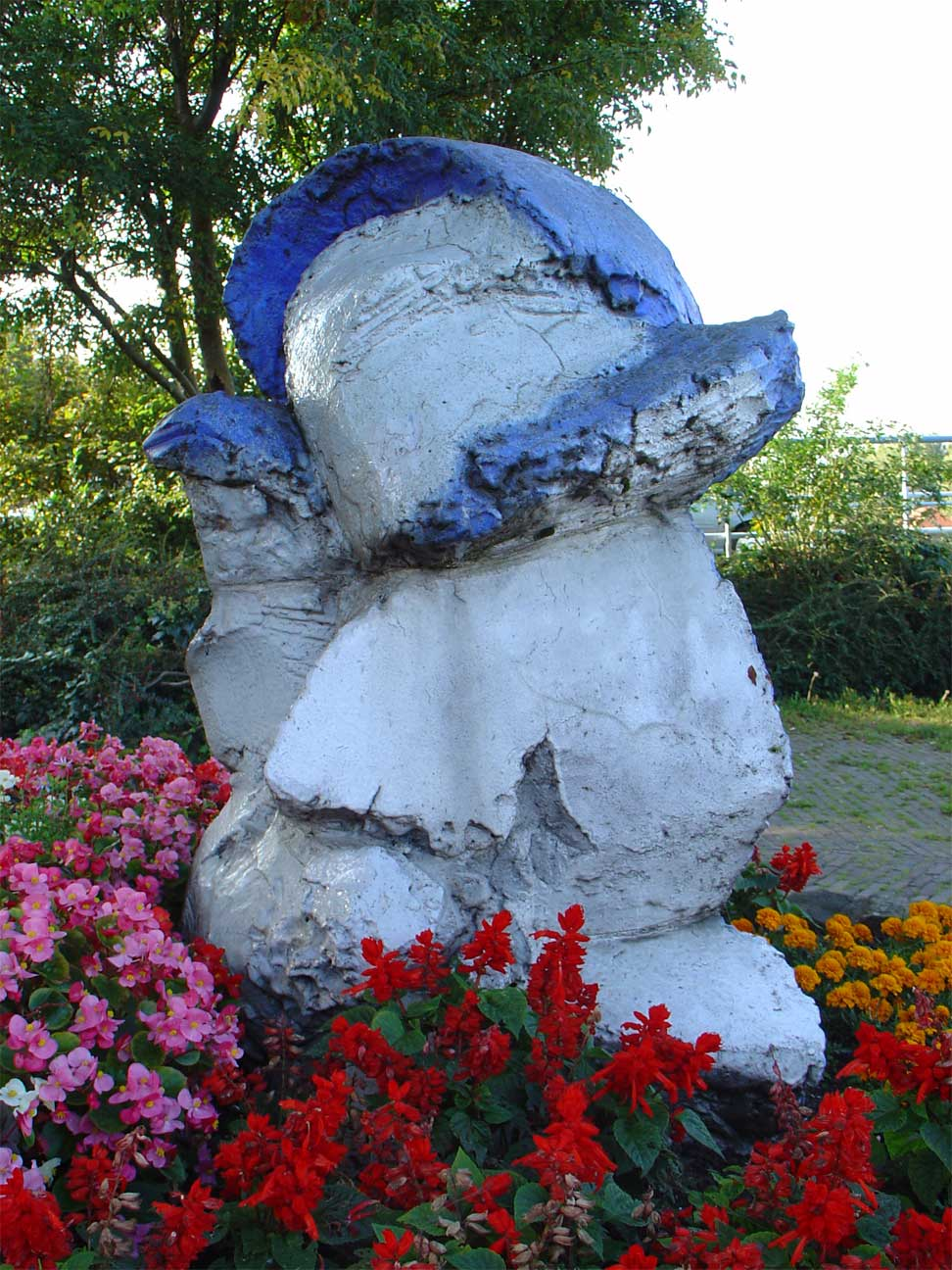
Untitled, Gouda.

David Johannes van de Kop or David Vandekop (The Hague, November 3, 1937 - Dreischor, September 14, 1994) was a Dutch painter, draftsman and sculptor.

== Life and work ==
From 1956 to 1961 Kop studied Royal Academy of Art, The Hague among others under Carel Visser, who taught sculpture. After graduation in 1963–64 he continued his studies at the Academy of Fine Arts in Warsaw.

From 1968 to 1981 was the lecturer at the Academy of Art and Design St. Joost in 's-Hertogenbosch and from 1981 to 1987 he was in head of the sculpture department of the postgraduate institute the Jan Van Eyck Academie in Maastricht. David van de Kop died on September 14, 1994, in his hometown of Dreischor from the effects of a heart attack.

== Materials and style ==
Following his mentor Carel Visser, in his early work Van de Kop worked in steel in a constructivist style. He named this kind of work "framework conditions". In the 1970s he came into prominence with this work. He increasingly started to work with clay, from which he made large ceramic sculptures in bright colors. The great plasticity of clay gave him the opportunity to give more playful, more intuitive and more organic form. These works are usually made up of several parts, put together after baking became the bigger picture.

In later years, Van der Kop worked with more rough-cut wood and made "stacks" of different materials and debris, which he also colorfully painted. Sources of inspiration for him included the Greek mythology (Leda with the Swan, Danae, Eros, Dionysos), Magdalena and the Zeeland landscape.

== Working in the public space (selection) ==
- Almere Eos (1994) Muziekwijk and Leda and the Swan (1994) Molenbuurt
- Amersfoort: untitled Park Randenbroek
- Amsterdam: untitled (1989) Atlas Building
- The Hague: Obstacle (1980) Schenk viaduct
- Gouda: Vanitas (1990) Wachtelstraat / Turfsingel, Gouda sculpture trail
- Rotterdam: untitled Westblaak
- Utrecht: untitled Ina Boudier-Bakkerlaan and Elements (1989) Smakkelaarsveld
- Veere: Inundation Memorial (1990) Polredijk
- Vlissingen: Eos (1992) Koudekerkseweg

== Photo gallery ==
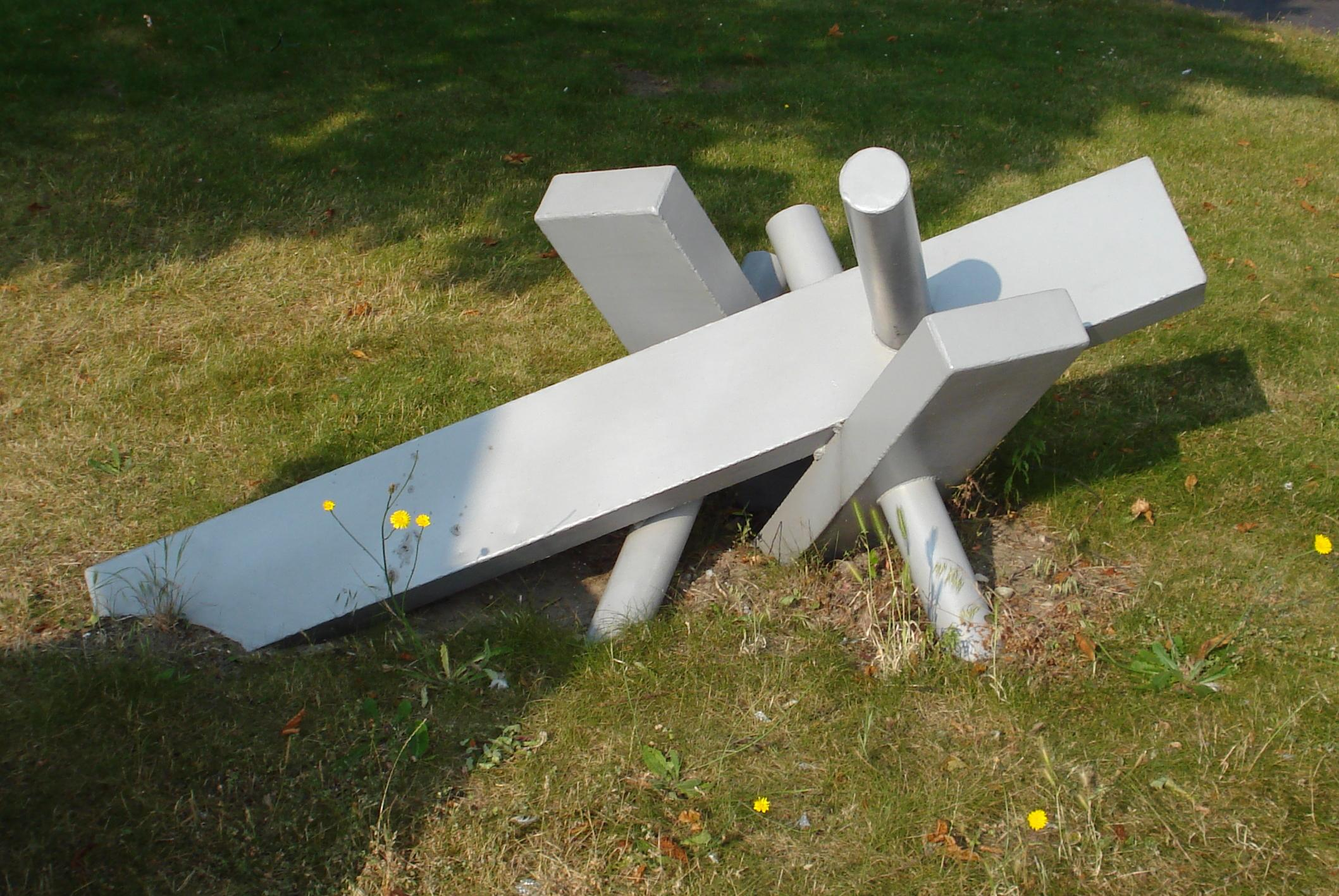
Obstacle, The Hague

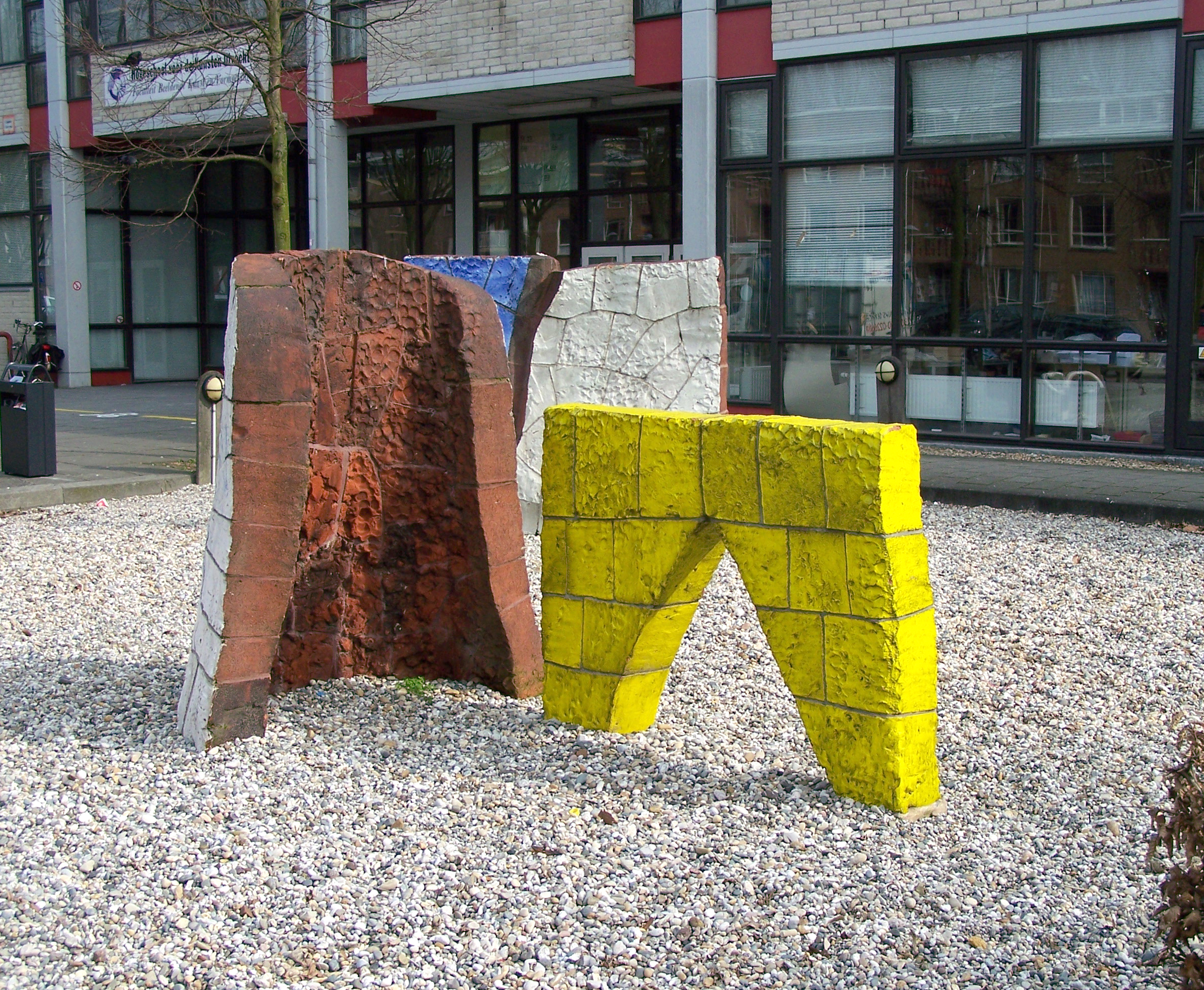
Untitled, Utrecht

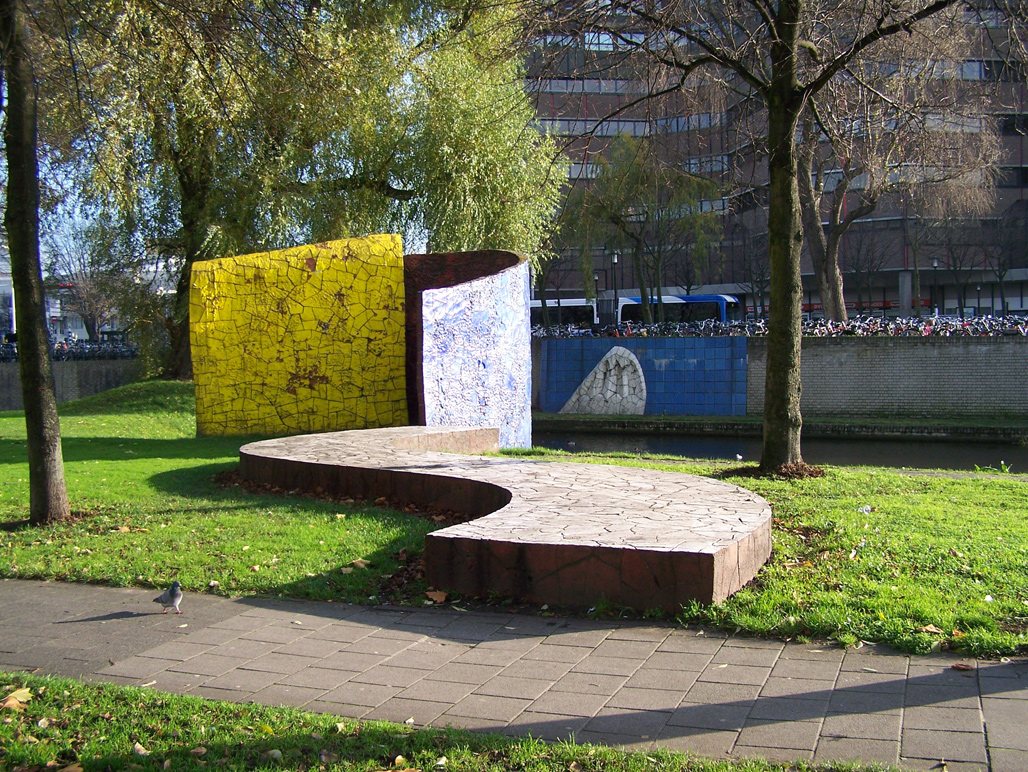
Ceramic elements, Utrecht

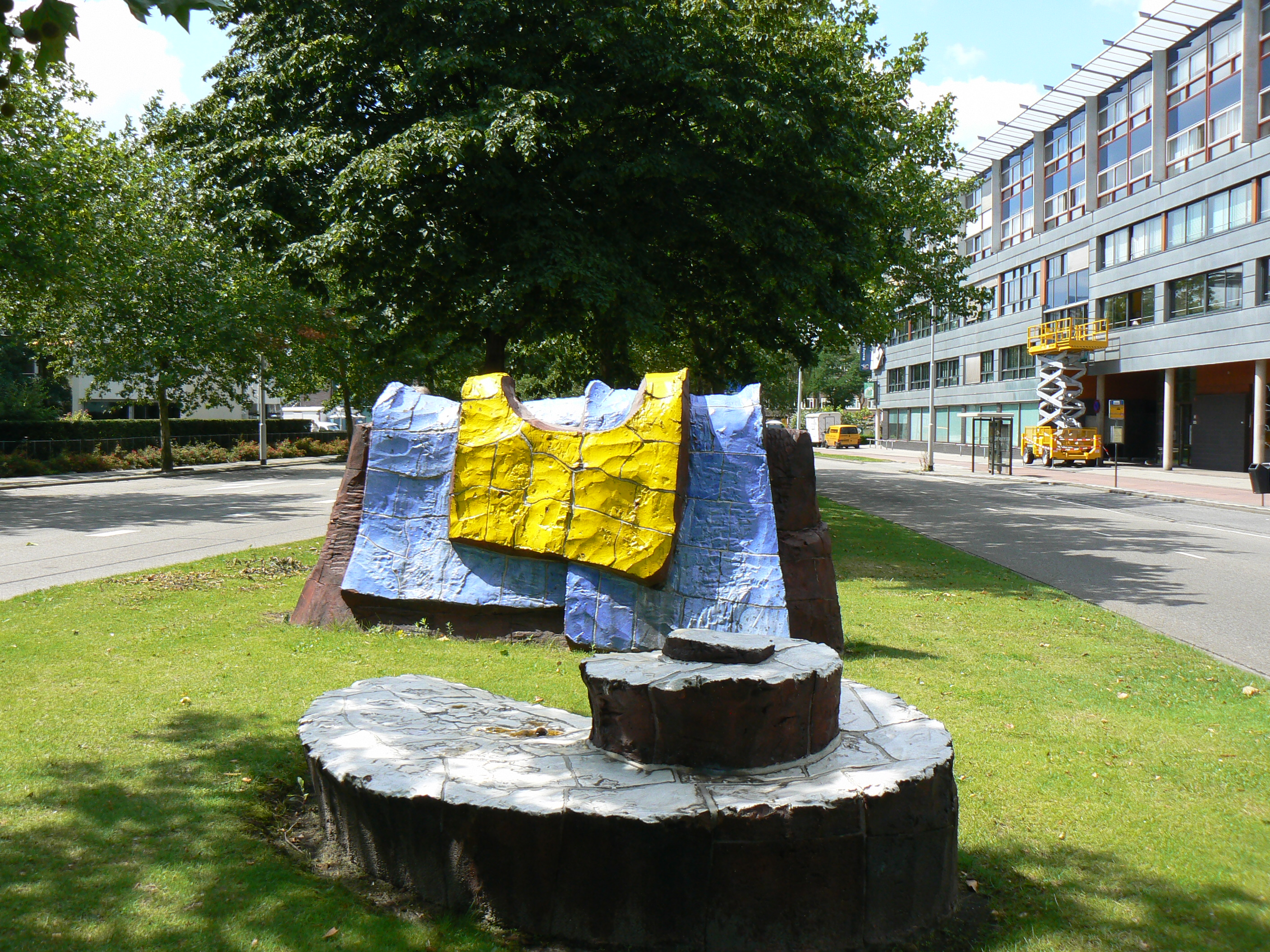
Untitled, Rotterdam

== See also ==
- List of Dutch ceramists
- List of Dutch sculptors
