= Theo van der Horst =

Dutch artist (1921–2003)

Theodoor (Theo) van der Horst
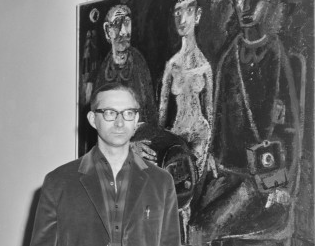
- Theo van der Horst
- Born: 18 July 1921; Arnhem, Netherlands
- Died: 9 October 2003 (aged 82); Arnhem, Netherlands
- Known for: painting, printmaking, sculpturing, stained glass making
- Movement: expressionism
- Awards: 1954 - Prijs van de Provincie Zeeland (watersnoodschilderij); 1954 - Arnhemse prijs voor de beeldende kunst; 1962 - Quarles van Uffordprijs voor schilderkunst (oeuvre)

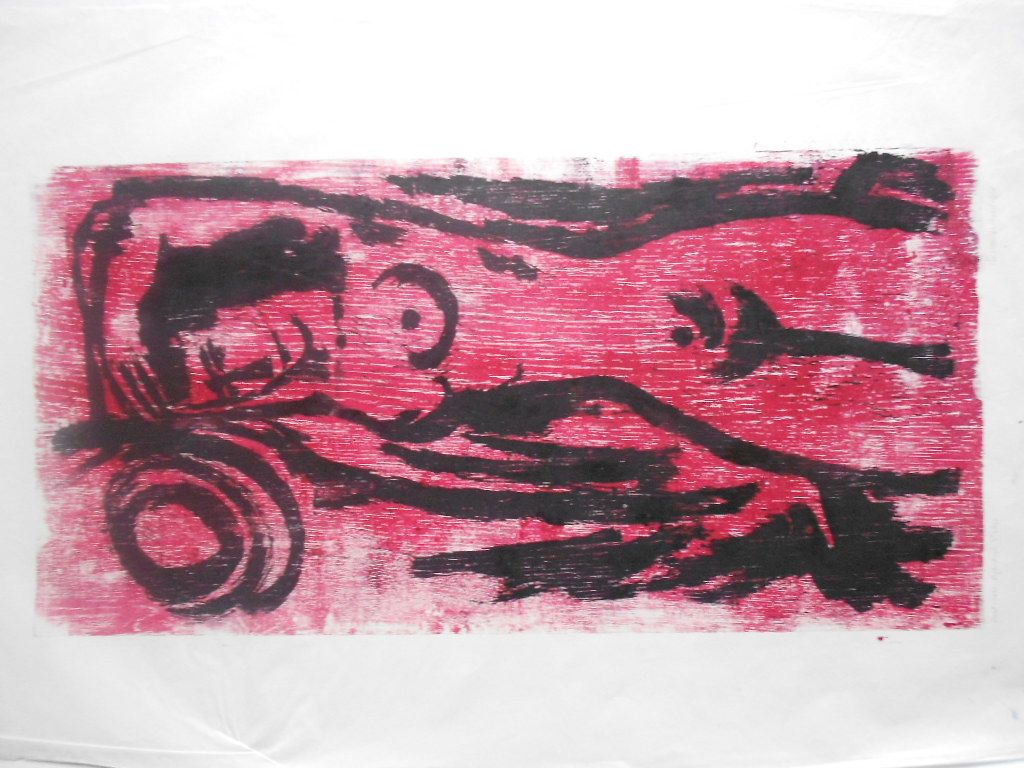
Linocut of Theo van der Horst

Theodoor (Theo) van der Horst (Arnhem, Netherlands, 18 July 1921 - Arnhem, 9 October 2003), was a Dutch painter, sculptor, graphic artist and glass artist. Van der Horst painted people, animals and landscapes in an expressionist style. Besides oil paintings he made etchings, drawings, gouaches, sculptures and stained glass. He exhibited until the seventies in galleries and museums, but then chose to live as a hermit. He died in October 2003 at the age of 82 in Arnhem.

== Exhibitions (selection) ==
- 1954 - Gemeentemuseum Arnhem - retrospective-exhibition
- 1962 - The Arnhem Gallery, Croydon (GB) - 6 Arnhem Painters (Wim Gerritsen, Klaas Gubbels, Jan Homan, Theo van der Horst, Johan Mekkink, Fred Sieger)
- 1963 - Museum Marburg (D)
- 1965 - CODA (Apeldoorn)|Gemeentelijke Van Reekum Galerij, Apeldoorn - Hedendaagse kunst in Gelderland (Marius van Beek, Klaas Gubbels, Theo van der Horst, Ko Oosterkerk, Fred Sieger, Piet Slegers, Gerrit Veenhuizen, Toon Vijftigschild).
- 1967 - Theater München
- Stedelijk Museum Schiedam
- Dordrechts Museum
- Group exhibitions at Berlin, Milan en Antwerp

== Awards ==
- 1954 - Prijs van de Provincie Zeeland (watersnoodschilderij)
- 1954 - Arnhemse prijs voor de beeldende kunst
- 1962 - Quarles van Uffordprijs voor schilderkunst (oeuvre)
