= Jan Snoeck =

Dutch sculptor and ceramist (1927–2018)

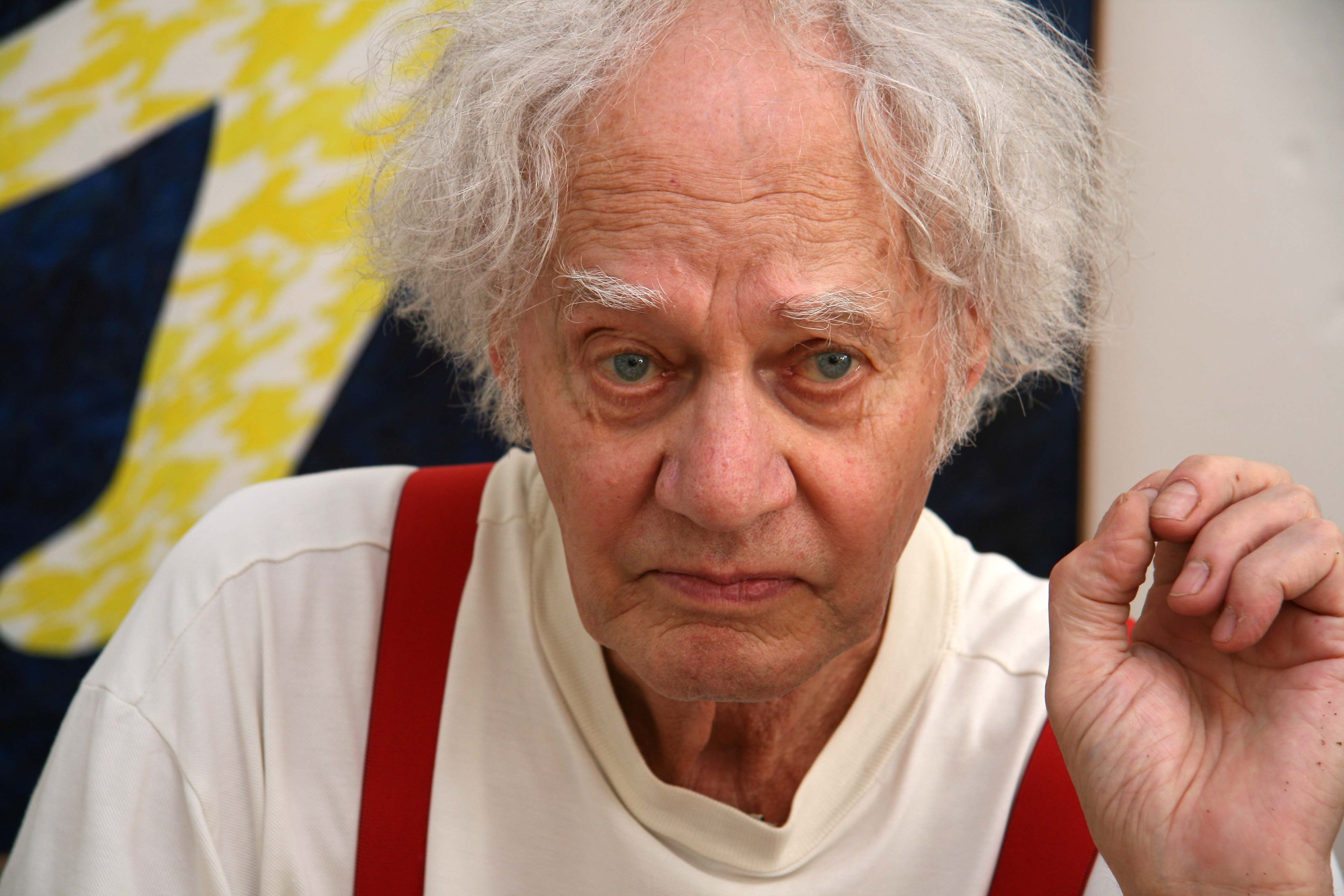
Jan Snoeck by Paul Kramer

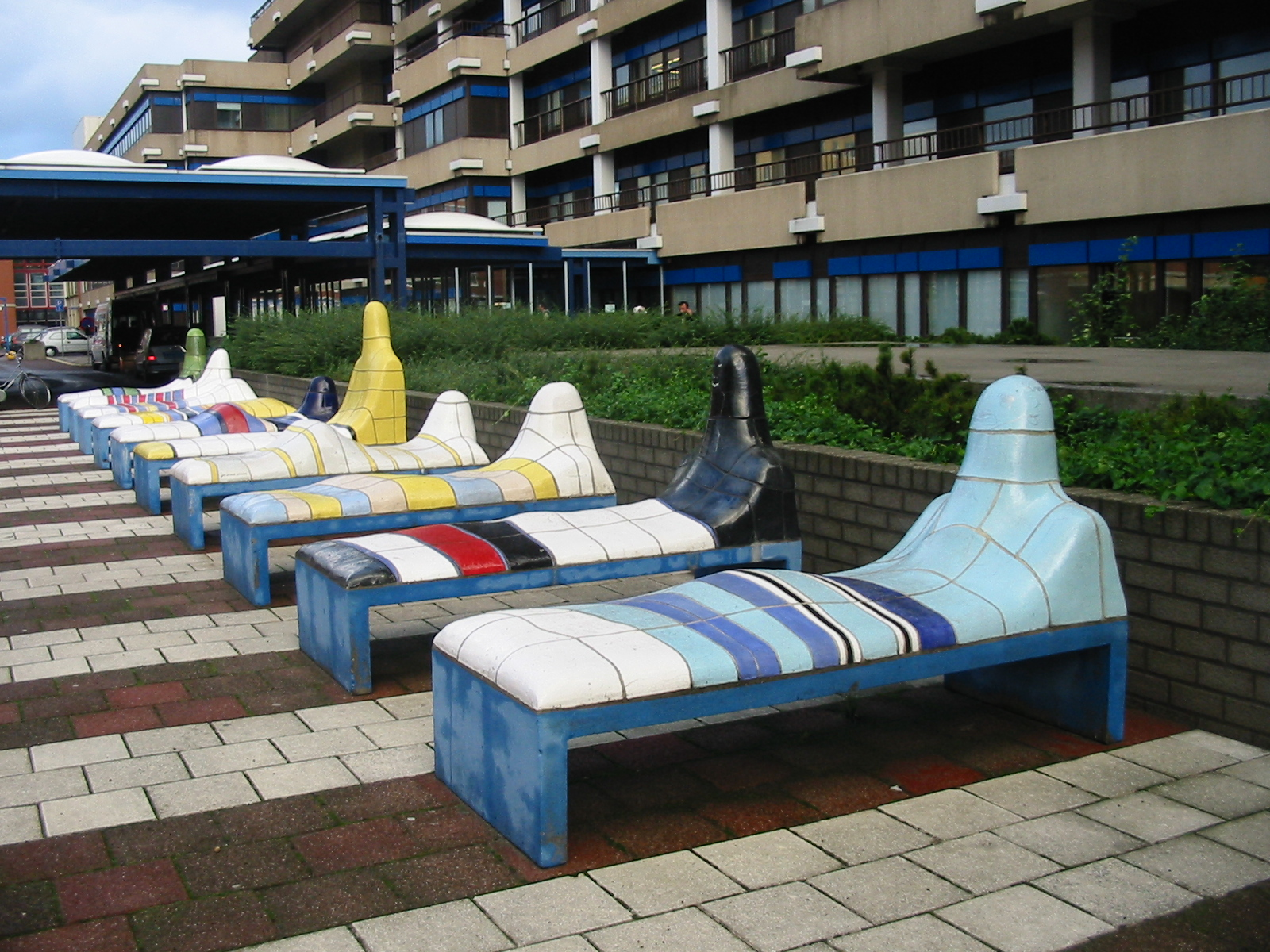
"Sick in bed" (1979) Westeinde Hospital in The Hague.

Jan Cornelis Snoeck (5 March 1927 – 31 March 2018) was a Dutch sculptor and ceramist.

== Life and work ==
Snoeck studied at the Royal Academy of Art, The Hague where he graduated in 1949. In 1953 he worked for a year in the workshop of Ossip Zadkine in Paris.

Initially Jan Snoeck worked with the materials stone, wood and bronze. Later he mainly worked in ceramics. He uses cheerful, primary colors and usually people are subject. Among other things, he made a sculpture "The beds" for Westeinde Hospital in The Hague (see image). The most monumental work of Snoeck is found both in the Netherlands and abroad.

Snoeck work is in the collections of the Stedelijk Museum Amsterdam, the Gemeentemuseum Den Haag, the Museum Boijmans Van Beuningen in Rotterdam, the Frans Hals Museum in Haarlem and the Princessehof Ceramics Museum in Leeuwarden.

On June 2, 2007 Snoeck was awarded the Aart van den IJssel prize by the municipality of Leidschendam-Voorburg. This prize is awarded every three years to a professional artist as a token of appreciation for his or her total oeuvre. The art award includes a cash prize of €5000, - and a small plastic glass, manufactured by the Voorburg artist Ming.

The museum Beelden aan Zee at Scheveningen in 2007 held a retrospective of the work of Jan Snoeck on the occasion of his eightieth birthday. He was appointed Knight of the Order of the Dutch Lion. The decorations was pinned on him during the opening of that exhibition, entitled "De goddelijke aardwormen van Jan Snoeck" (The Divine earthworms Jan Snoeck).

== Gallery ==
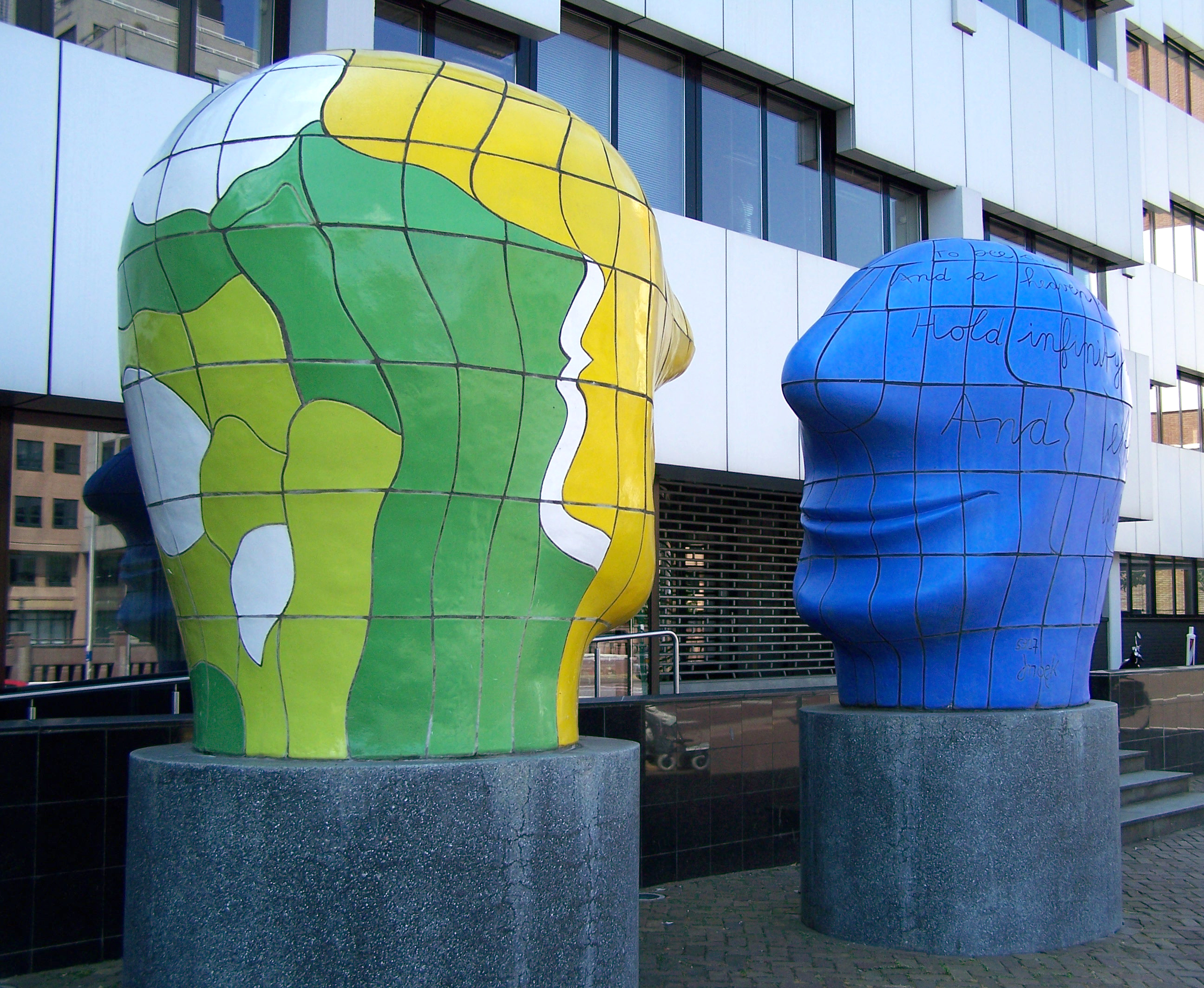
Dialoog (2001), Deventer

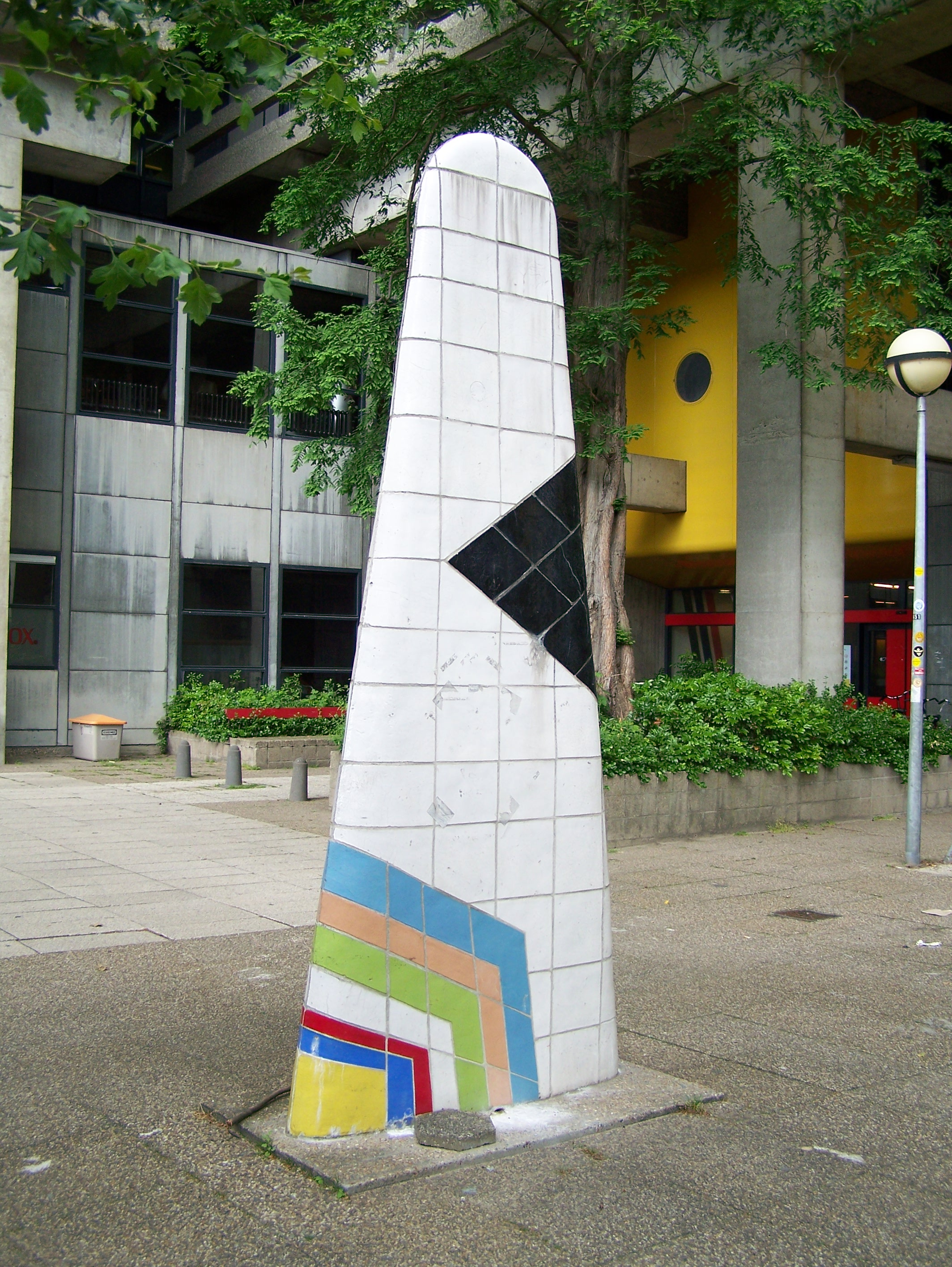
untitled, Uithof in Utrecht

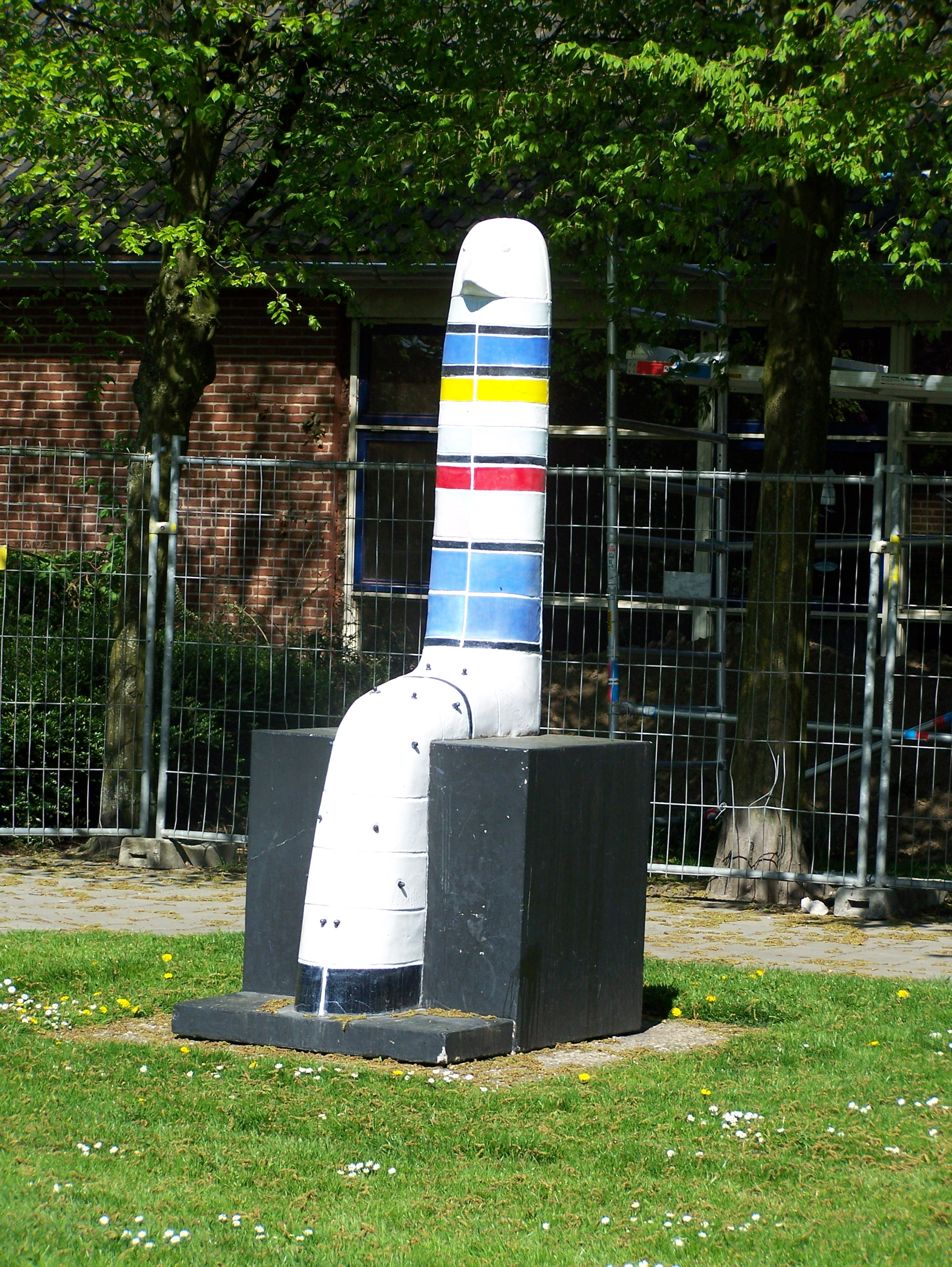
Penelope, Engelenbergplantsoen in Kampen

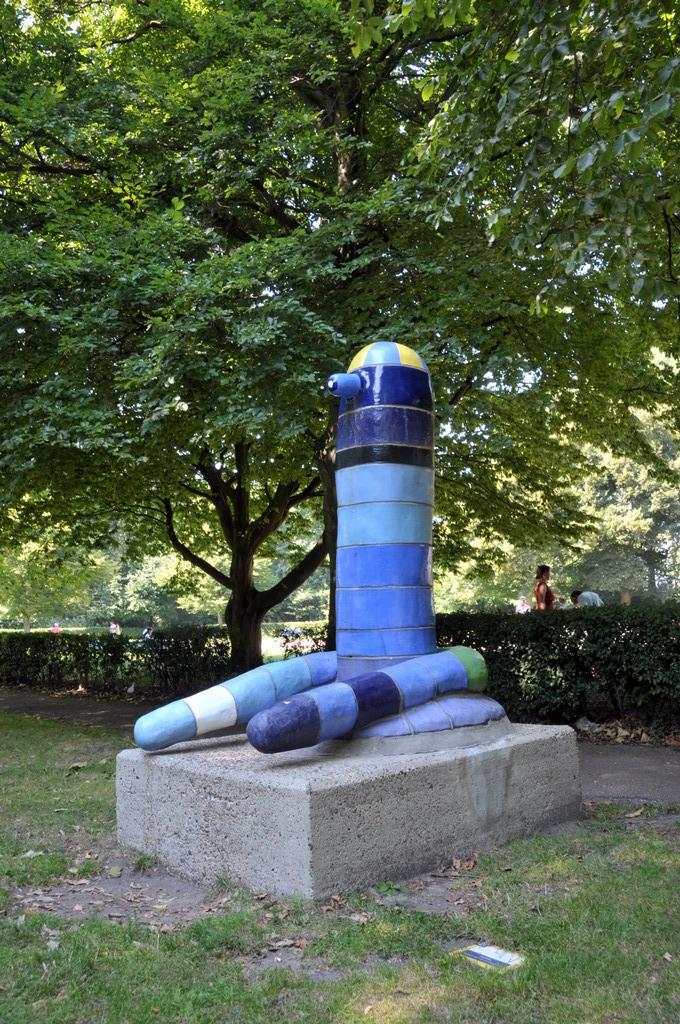
Man (1971), Beeldenroute Zuiderpark The Hague

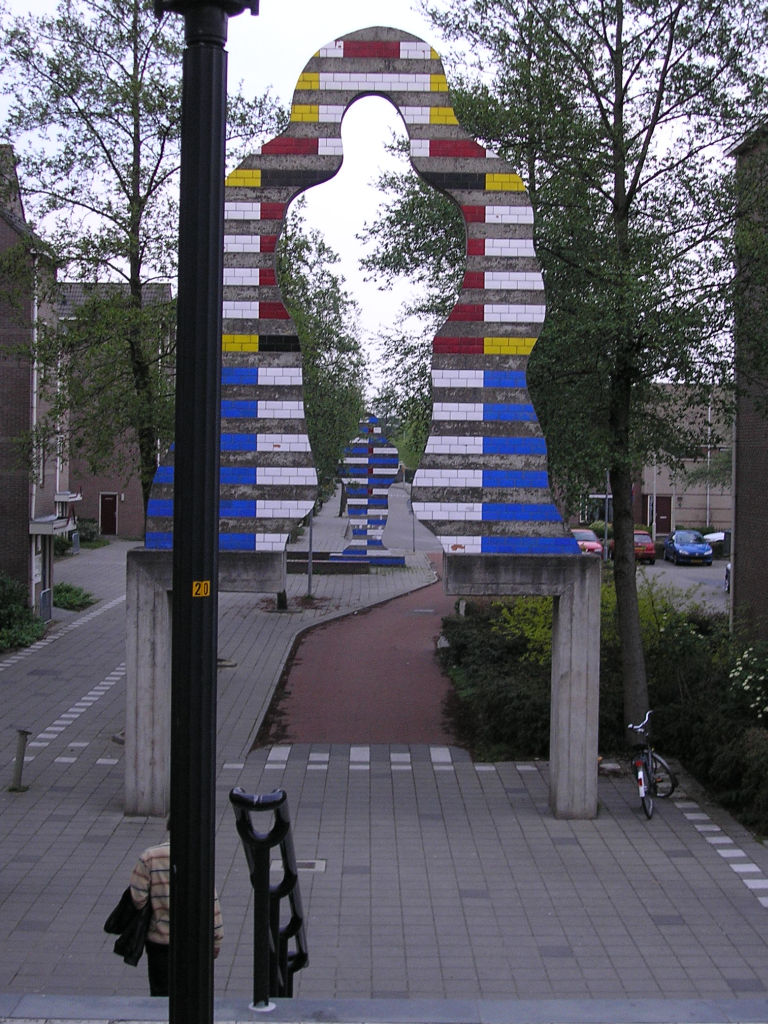
Ceramic figure' nearby the mall Stadspoort in Ede

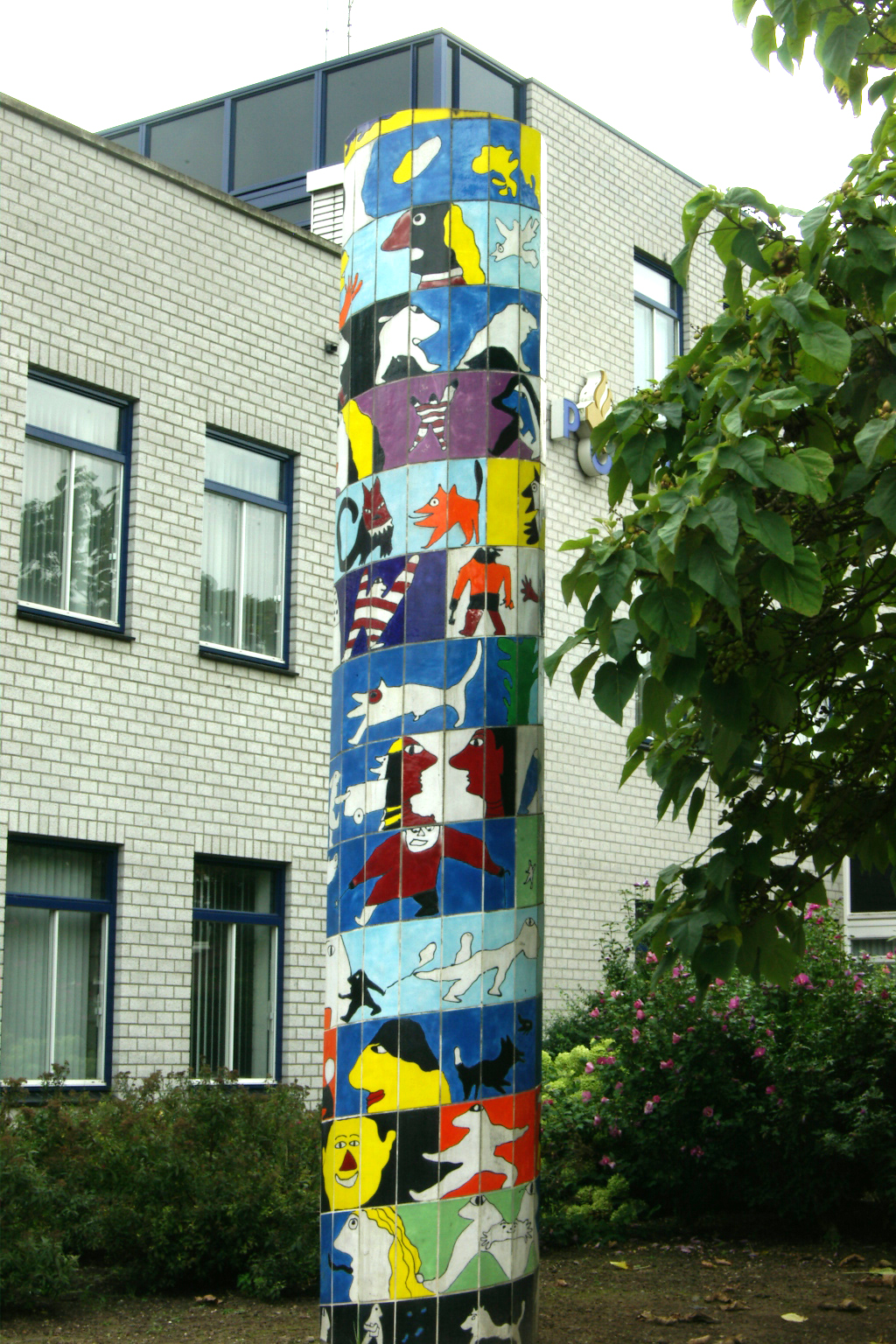
Column (1994) by police station, Princess Beatrixlaan, Tiel

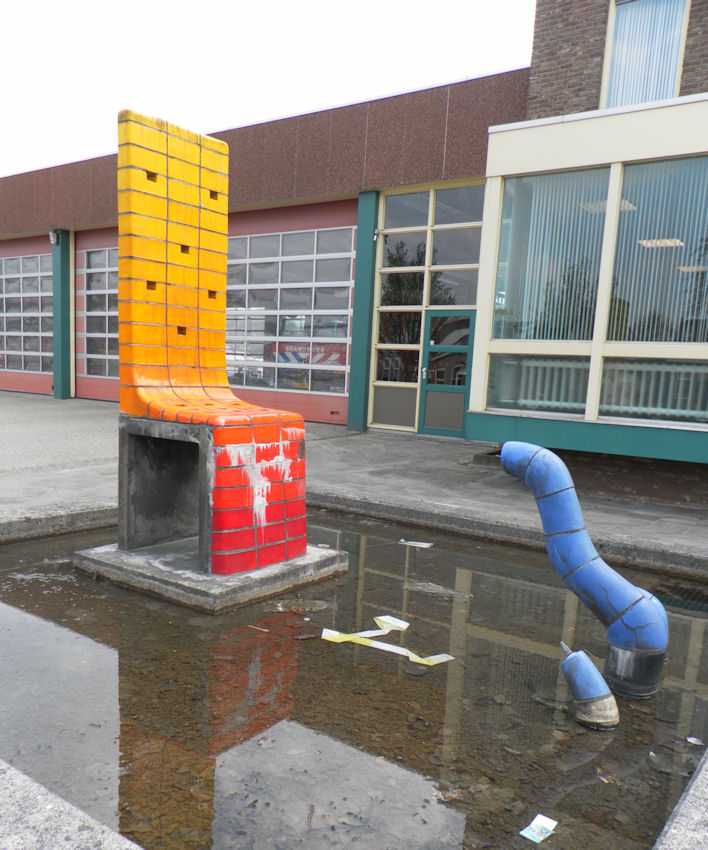
Ceramic chair (1981), Het Kanaal in Assen

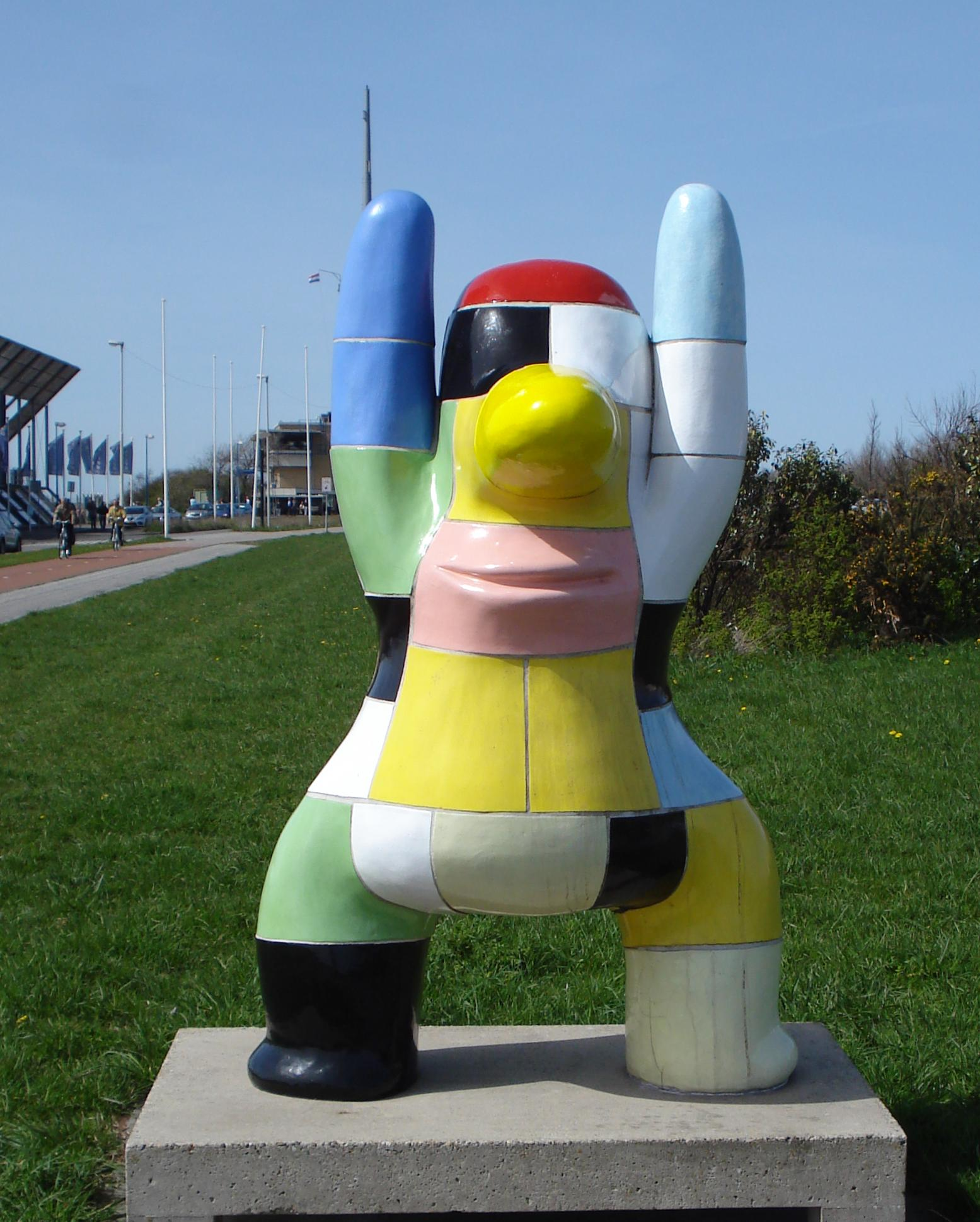
The male (2001), Hook of Holland

== See also ==
- List of Dutch sculptors
- List of Dutch ceramists
