= Cris Agterberg =

Dutch artist and ceramist

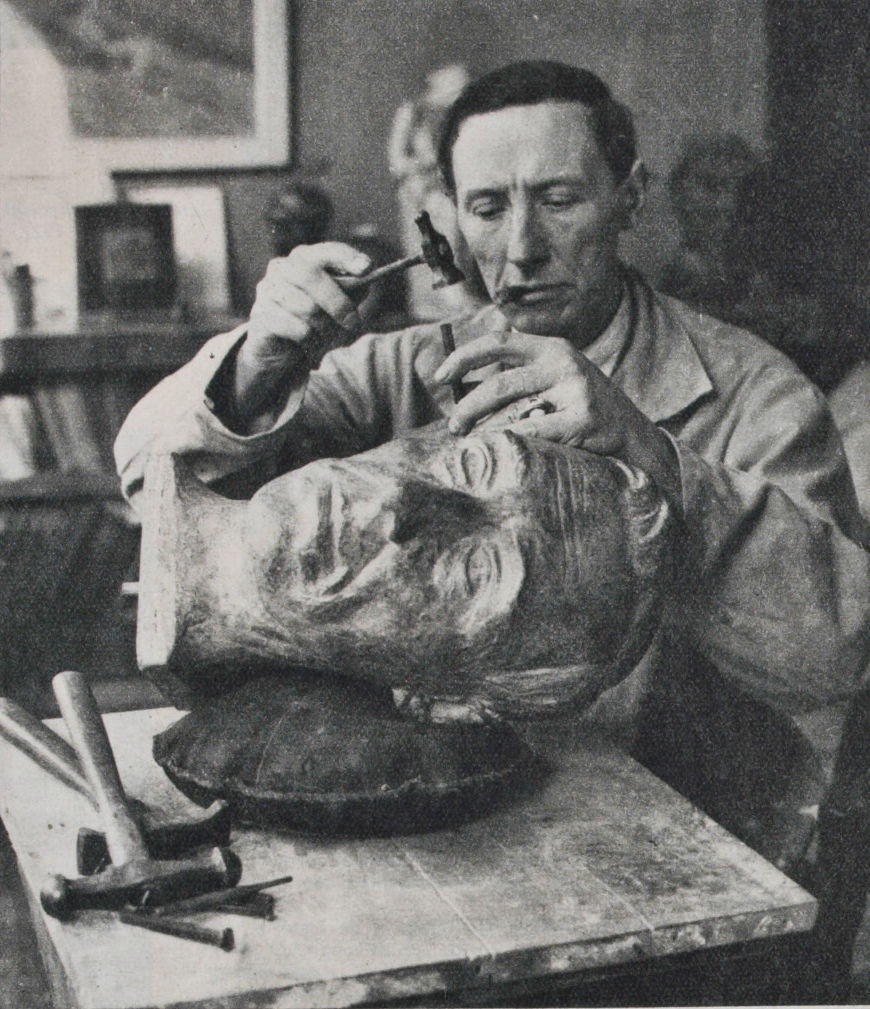
Cris Agterberg

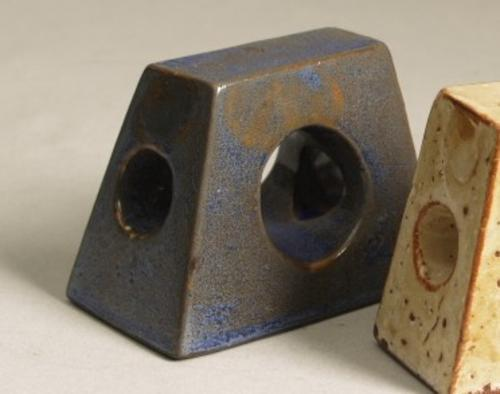
Object in asymmetric trapezoid shape, 1940-50.

Christopher "Cris" Agterberg (22 April 1883 – 21 November 1948) was a Dutch artist and ceramist.

== Life and work ==
Agterberg was born in Amsterdam as the son of Christopher Agterberg Sr., plasterer, and Alida Gramberg. He studied at the Quellinus school and the School of Applied Arts in Elberfeld, Germany. In 1905 he married Rebecca Hartgers, who was active as a textile designer. Agterberg made ceramics, worked in wood, glass, leather and metal, designed jewelry and masks and was bookbinding designer. He called himself "sculptor and decorative artist."

In 1932 he joined Anton Mussert's National Socialist Movement (NSB) with membership number 57. During the early years of the NSB he designed, among other things, the hall decorations for the NSB's public meetings. The first headquarters of the NSB, on the Oudegracht in Utrecht, was located in the building that was originally Agterberg's studio. During the Second World War he was a member of the Advisory Council for Commissions to Visual Artists for the Applied Arts. The Council was founded by "The Dutch House of Art," a body created by the Nazi Department of Public Information and the Arts. In the same period Agterberg managed the exhibition gallery "The Consthuys St. Peter," which was regarded as a branch of the Dutch Kunsthuis, in Utrecht. He also designed several awards for the NSB, such as the plaque "Struggle and Sacrifice" and an "Eastern Front" plaque.

In 1947 Agterberg was convicted for his behavior during the German occupation. He was released immediately after his conviction because the sentence imposed on him was equal to the time he had spent in pre-trial detention. The verdict also took into consideration the fact that he suffered from a fatal illness and that he had never betrayed anyone. He died the following year in Utrecht.

In 2002, a retrospective exhibition of furniture, jewelry, and small everyday objects designed by Agterberg took place at the Centraal Museum in Utrecht.

== Work in public collections ==
- Rijksmuseum, Amsterdam
- Princessehof Ceramics Museum, Leeuwarden

== Bibliography (selection) ==
- Brouwer, M. and Haffmans, J. (2001) Cris Agterberg; sculptor and decorative artist. Vianen: Optima ISBN 90-76940-04-5 and ISBN 90-76940-03-7.
- Karsten, JM (2006) Insignia of the Movement: an illustrated overview of insignia of the National Socialist Movement 1931-1945. Lunteren Promil. ISBN 90-810-654-1-6.
- Kuyvenhoven, F. (2010) Index of Dutch visual artists, applied artists and photographers. ISBN 9789072905550.
- Venema, A. (1986) Art dealers in the Netherlands 1940-1945. Amsterdam: Workers Press. ISBN 90-295-5010-4.

== See also ==
- List of Dutch ceramists
- List of Dutch sculptors
