= Pepijn van den Nieuwendijk =

Dutch painter and ceramist

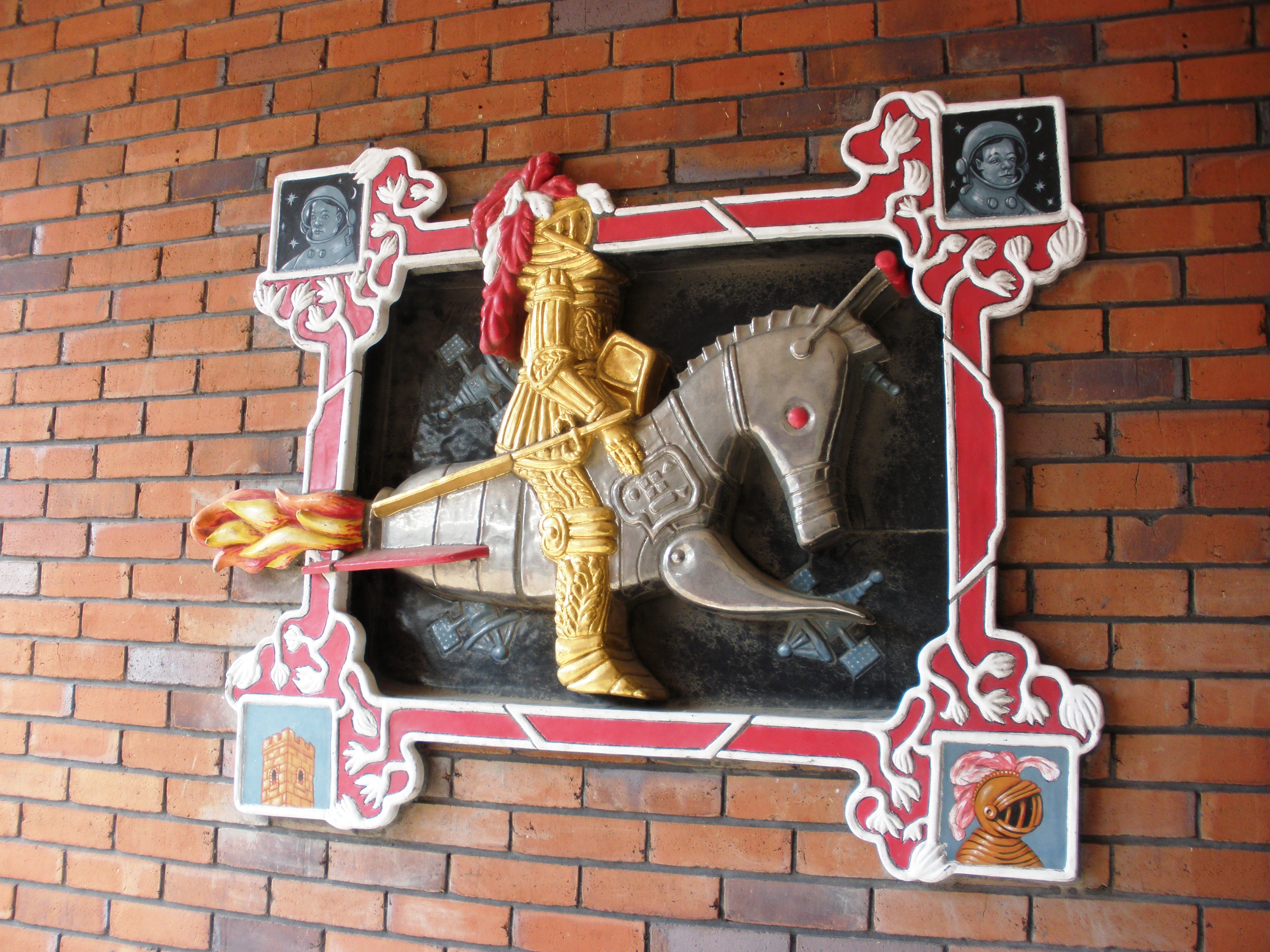
The space knight of Woerden in Woerden.

Pepijn van den Nieuwendijk (Waddinxveen, October 13, 1970) is a Dutch painter and ceramist.

== Life and work ==
Van den Nieuwendijk graduated in 1995 as a graphic designer. After his studies he focused on illustrating and painting, until he came into contact with ceramics in 2002.

In October 2007 he hit the headlines after he solved a major art theft via Google from Hague galleries. As he searched for his own name, he found his stolen works of art at an auction site. Besides the paintings of Pepin van den Nieuwendijk the police discovered the thief of more than a hundred paintings and sculptures by various artists.

== See also ==
- List of Dutch ceramists
- List of Dutch sculptors
