= Pepin, Iran =

Pepin پپين
- Village
- Location within Iran
- Coordinates: 36°34′04″N 52°30′01″E
- Country: Iran
- Province: Mazandaran
- County: Amol
- Bakhsh: Dabudasht
- Rural District: Dabuy-ye Jonubi

Population (2006)
  - Total: 121
- Time zone: UTC+3:30 (IRST)

Pepin (Persian: پپين, also Romanized as Pepīn) is a village in Dabuy-ye Jonubi Rural District, Dabudasht District, Amol County, Mazandaran Province, Iran. At the 2006 census, its population was 121, in 28 families.
