= Pippen =

Pippen is a surname. Notable people with the surname include:

- Cotton Pippen (1911–1981), American baseball player
- Danny Pippen (born 1997), American basketball player
- Kavion Pippen (born 1996), American basketball player
- Larsa Pippen (born 1974), American reality television personality
- Lovetta Pippen (21st century), American singer
- Scottie Pippen (born 1965), American basketball player
- Scotty Pippen Jr. (born 2000), son of the above; American basketball player

== See also ==
- Pippin (name), given name and surname
