= Pippin (name) =

Pippin or Pepin is a given name and surname. It is a masculine given name of Frankish origin with uncertain meaning. The name was borne by various members of the Carolingian family that ruled the Austrasian Empire in the Middle Ages, in what is now France and the western parts of Germany; most notably Pepin the Short, the first Carolingian king of the Franks and father of Charlemagne. Other variations of the name include Pipin, Pépin (French), Pippen, Pepijn (Dutch), Peppino or Pepino (Italian), and Pepe (Spanish).

== Origin ==
Wider use of the first name Pepin and its derivatives stem from the Carolingian kings. There are various explanations of the meaning of the name:

- Derived from the Frankish word bib meaning "to tremble" (compare modern Dutch bibberen, meaning to tremble or shiver), thus it could mean "awe-inspiring".
- Dutch sources suggest that the name Pepijn is an infantile corruption of Wilbert or Wilbrecht meaning will and bright, where Wilbert gets shortened into Wilbo which morphed into Pippo and finally into Pepin.
- Late-formed examples of the English surname may alternatively be from Old French pepin or pipin ‘seed of a fruit’, and thus a metonymic occupational name for a gardener or grower of fruit trees.
- In Spanish and Italian the names Pepe, Pepin and Peppino are a shortening or nickname for José, Jusepe or Giuseppe, which all are names for Joseph. The Frankish name probably comes from a different stem as the historical figures in these languages are called Pipino, not Peppe or Peppino.

== People ==
=== Carolingians ===
- Pepin of Landen (c. 580–640), nicknamed the Elder, sometimes listed as a saint
- Pepin of Herstal (c. 635–714), nicknamed the Middle
- Pepin the Short or Pippin the Younger (c. 714–768), father of Charlemagne
- Pepin the Hunchback (c. 769 – 811), first son of Charlemagne
- Pepin of Italy (777–810), second son of Charlemagne, born Carloman and later named Pepin
- Pepin I of Aquitaine (797–838), grandson of Charlemagne, son of Louis the Pious
- Pepin II of Aquitaine (823–864), son of Pepin I of Aquitaine
- Pepin I, Count of Vermandois (817–850), grandson of Pepin of Italy
- Pepin II, Count of Vermandois (845–893), great-grandson of Pepin of Italy

=== Other people ===
- Clermont Pépin (1926–2006), Canadian pianist, composer and teacher
- Ercilia Pepín (1886-1939), teacher, feminist, and equal rights activist in the Dominican Republic.
- Jacques Pépin (born 1935), French chef, television personality and writer
- Paula Nenette Pepin (1908–1990), French composer, pianist and lyricist
- Shiloh Pepin (1999–2009), sirenomelia patient
- Théophile Pépin (1826–1904), French mathematician
- Victor Pépin (1780–1845), American circus performer and owner
- Dan Pippin (1926–1965), American basketball player
- Donald Pippin (Broadway director) (1926–2022), American theatrical musical director and conductor
- Donald Pippin (opera director) (1926–2021), American pianist, founder of Pocket Opera
- Horace Pippin (1888–1946), self-taught African-American painter
- Robert B. Pippin (born 1948), American philosopher
- Pepín (footballer, born 1931), Spanish footballer, real name José Casas
- Ludwig Lachner (1910–2003), German footballer and manager nicknamed "Pipin"
- Pippin Drysdale (born 1943), Australian ceramicist and art instructor, Australia's highest earning ceramic artist
- Pepín (footballer, born 1996), Equatoguinean footballer, real name José Machin

== Characters ==
- a character in the novel Moby-Dick by Herman Melville
- the nickname of Peregrin Took in J.R.R. Tolkien's The Lord of the Rings
- the protagonist of the novel The Short Reign of Pippin IV by John Steinbeck
- the yellow dog in a picture book series by K. V. Johansen
- the little boy in the BBC children's programme Pogles' Wood
- the dog in the BBC children's programme Come Outside
- Pippin, an American musical based on Pepin the Hunchback
- a mercenary soldier member of the Band of the Hawk in Berserk (manga)

== See also ==
- Pippen, surname
- Saint Pepin (disambiguation)
