= Gieterveen =

- Village
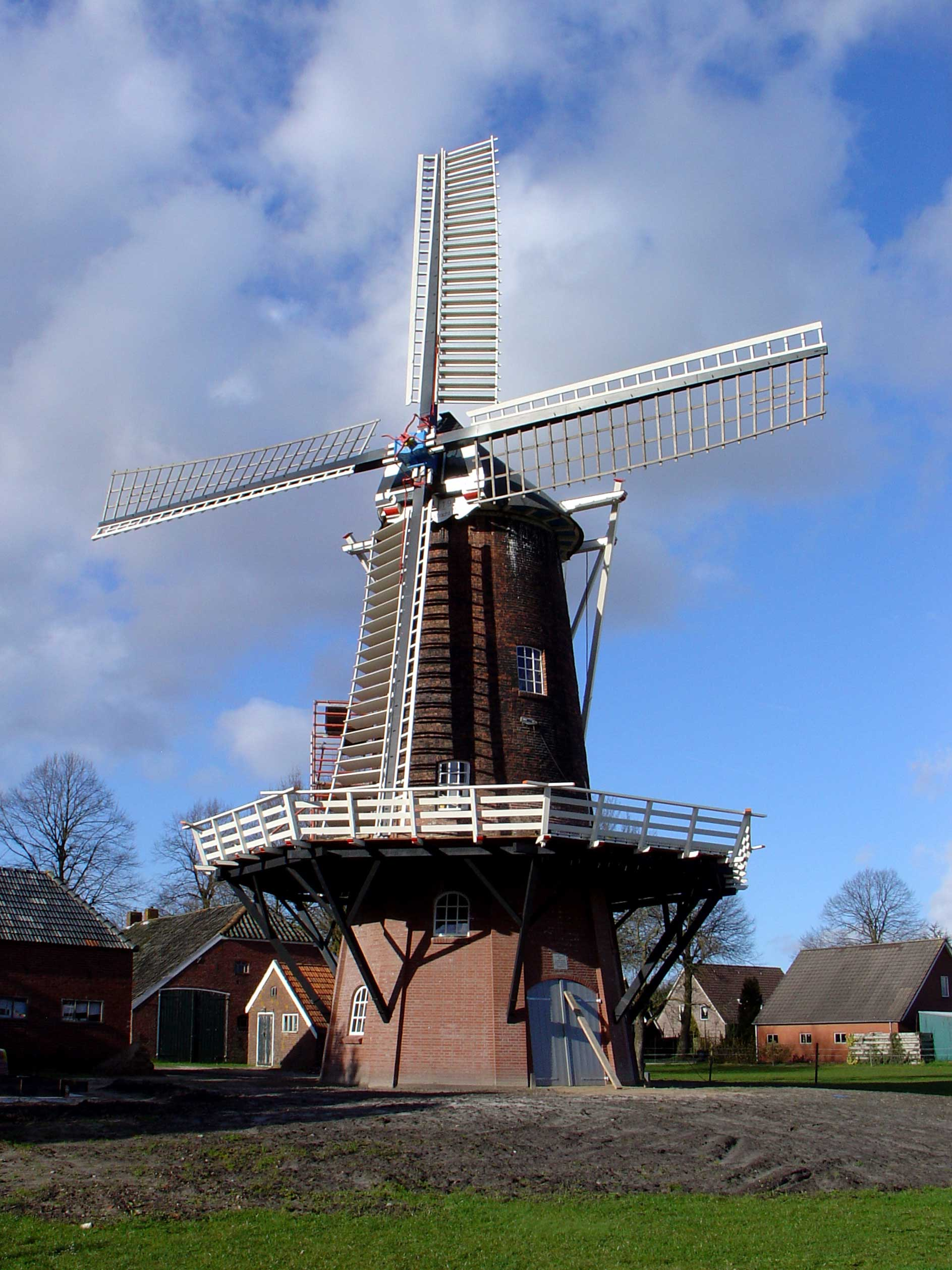
- The windmill

- Flag

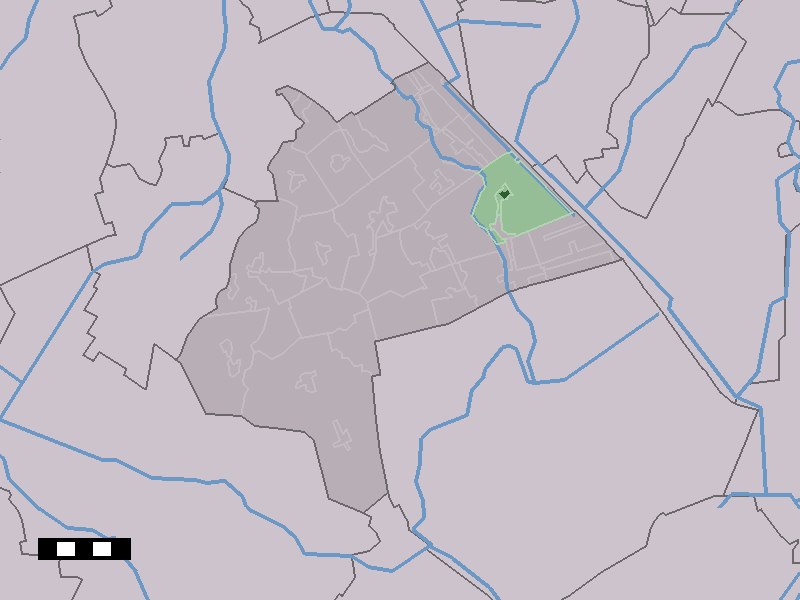
- The village centre (dark green) and the statistical district (light green) of Gieterveen in the municipality of Aa en Hunze.

- Location in the Netherlands Gieterveen (Netherlands)
- Coordinates: 53°1′38″N 6°50′16″E
- Country: Netherlands
- Province: Drenthe
- Municipality: Aa en Hunze

Area
  - Total: 15.40 km^{2} (5.95 sq mi)
- Elevation: 4 m (13 ft)

Population (2021)
  - Total: 875
  - Density: 56.8/km^{2} (147/sq mi)
- Time zone: UTC+1 (CET)
  - Summer (DST): UTC+2 (CEST)
- Postal code: 9511
- Dialing code: 0599

Gieterveen is a village in the Dutch province of Drenthe. It is a part of the municipality of Aa en Hunze, and lies about 19 km east of Assen.

== History ==
The village was first mentioned in 1458 as "Gheter vene", and means "peat (colony) belonging to Gieten. Gieterveen developed after 1450 on a sandy ridge of the Hondsrug as a satellite of Gieten. It started as a peat excavation colony, and the rent of the houses used to be paid by peat. In 1840, it became an independent parish.

The Dutch Reformed church dates from 1840 and has been built in a neoclassic style. Around 1915, a consistory has been added to the back of the church.

Gieterveen was home to 595 people in 1840. The figure seems high, but there were probably barracks for the nearby peat excavation projects.

== Gallery ==
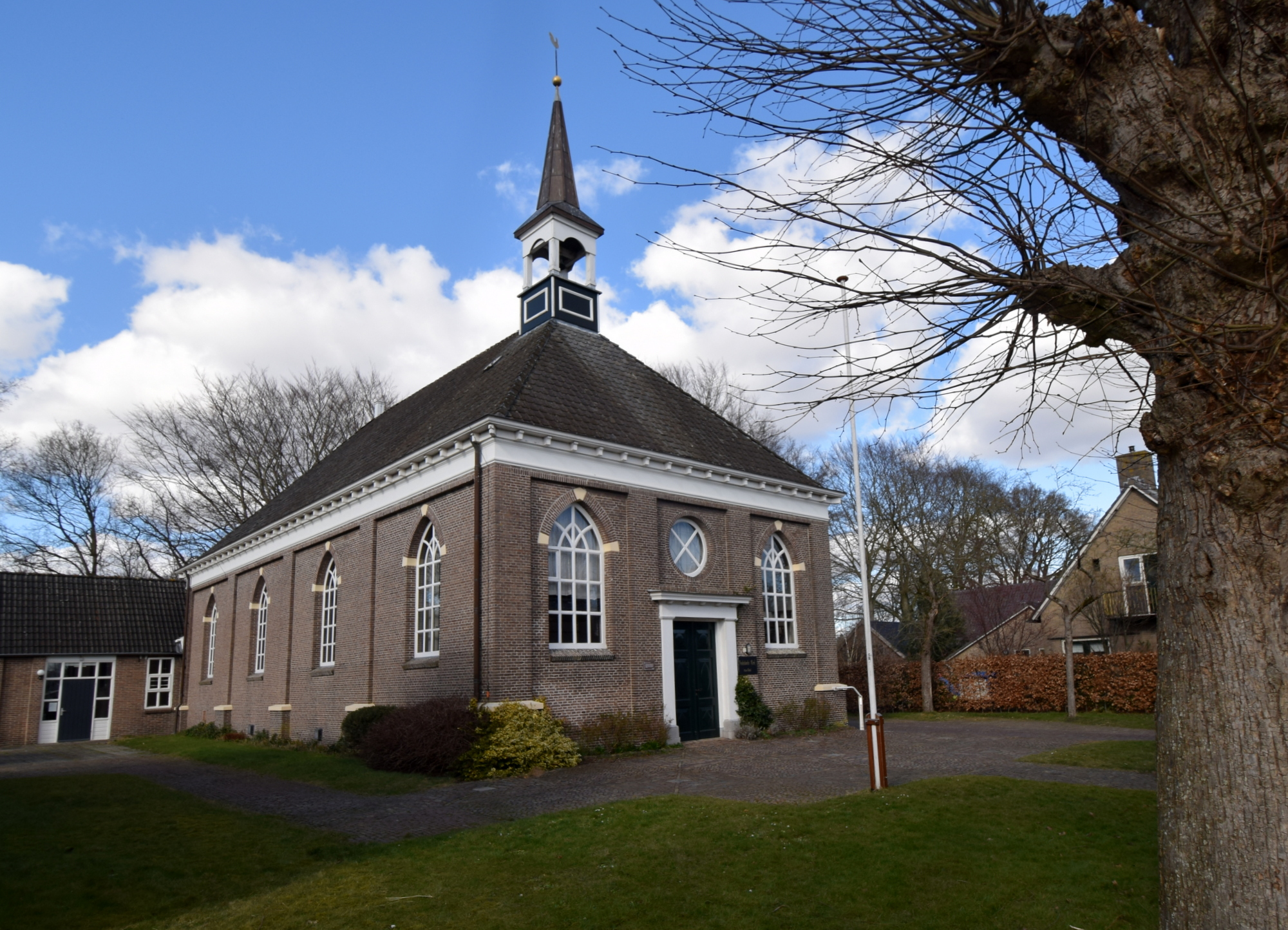
Protestant church

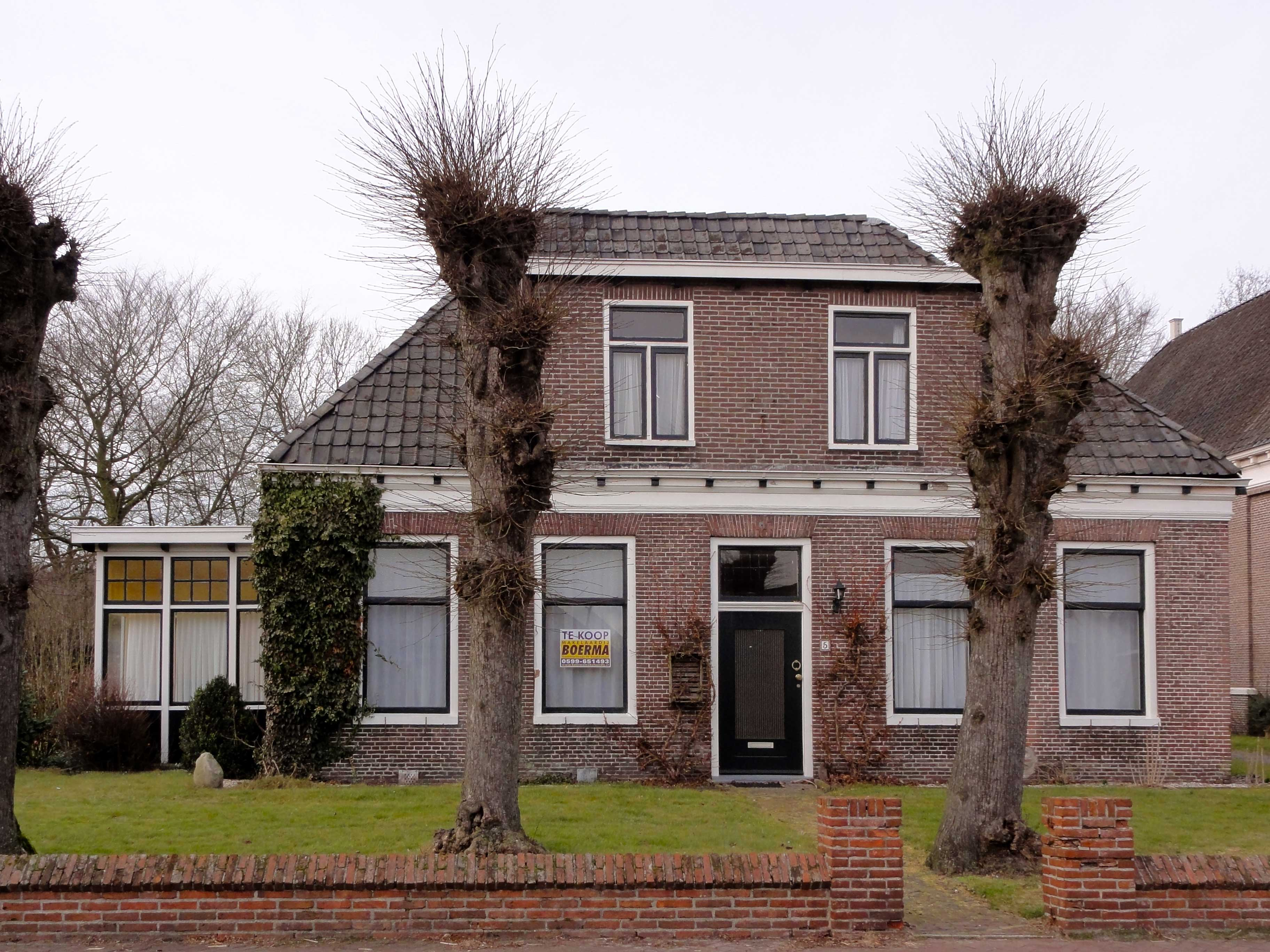
Former clergy house

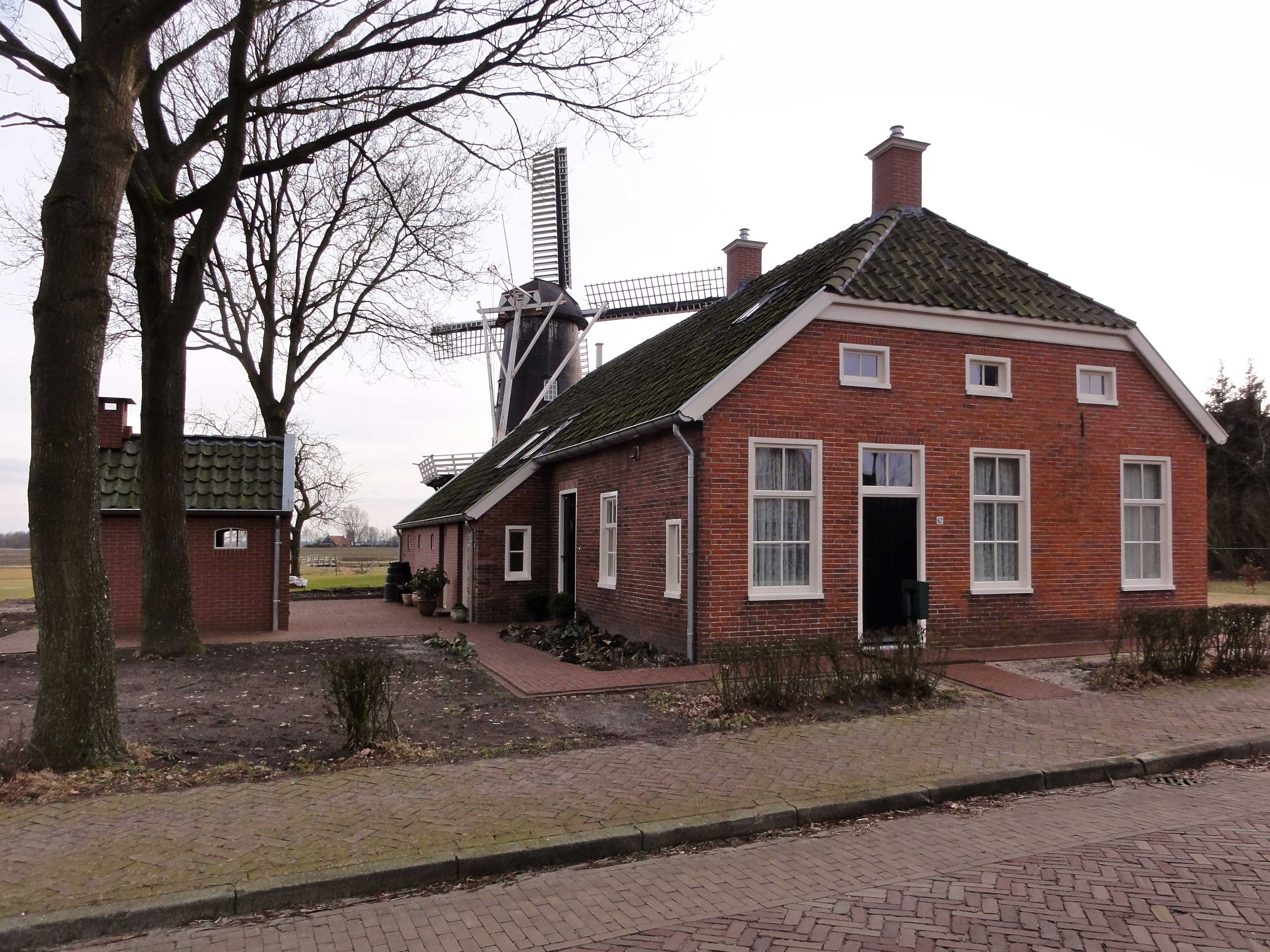
Miller's home

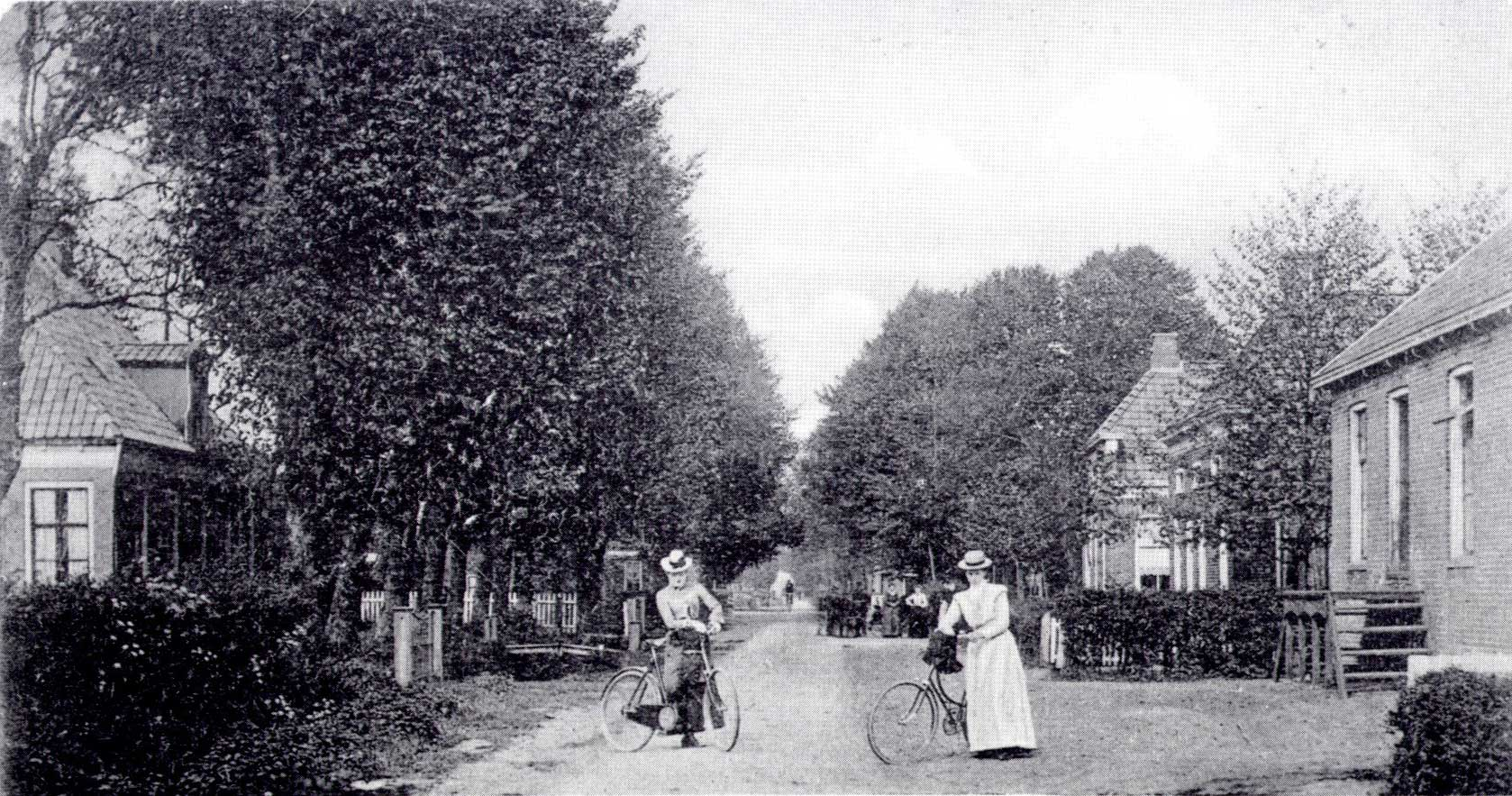
Gieterveen in 1905
