= Leonard van Munster =

Leonard van Munster (born February 1972, Zwolle) is a Dutch contemporary artist making Site-specific and Subject-specific work. He studied from 1992 to 1996 at the Gerrit Rietveld Academy in Amsterdam. This included an exchange programme to Parsons School of Art and Cooper Union in New York.

Van Munster's installations are to be found mostly in public spaces, where the surroundings play an important role in the work and how it is experienced. Sometimes, he chooses a location that suits an already made sketch, and sometimes he makes a work especially for a specific location. Although his works at first glance have a cheery or boyish look about them, there is a more sensitive idea at their basis. Recurrent underlying themes are desire, homesickness and sentiment: a frozen moment of happiness or a childhood memory.

The sometimes even comical appearance of his work has the effect of a layer of pink sugar frosting. This can be witnessed in his Fata Morgana [Under heaven 02], built under the A10 highway in Amsterdam. An oasis under the highway, where palm trees, banana trees and flowers grow and a waterfall splashes down off some rocks. The sun appears always to be shining. All this is made of plastic and surrounded by metres-high steel fencing. He also built a tree, complete with tree-house, on the roof of the 50 metres high Stedelijk Museum when it was housed in the Post CS building in Amsterdam [Under heaven 01] and in the Green Heart’ area of the Netherlands, he floated a log with, on it, a fox with a white flag in his paws. The often large objects he makes in public spaces can usually be viewed only for a short while. Take for instance, the recently completed work he made especially for the ‘World of Witte de With’ Festival: an island with a metropolitan structure in the middle of the pond between the Boijmans Van Beuningen Museum and the Kunsthal in Rotterdam.

At the moment, Leonard van Munster is working on several projects including an installation commissioned by the Stadsschouwburg (Metropolitan Theatre) of Amsterdam, ‘The dancing White Man’.

== Life and art ==
=== Private Room 02 (2004–2006) ===
During this time, he was commissioned in 2004, to create a piece for the toilets of cultural centrum the Balie in Amsterdam, the Netherlands.

The result was Private Room 02, Talking toilets (4) The toilets are equipped with all sorts of sensors. Not only talking to the visitor about how to behave, but also mixing up facts found on Google.

=== Recent work ===
- 2015, Fortuna, a site specific installation, A seaworthy motor yacht laying on her side in the middle of the financial center of Amsterdam, in front of the Headquarters of the ABNAMRO-bank (Zuidas), 2014
- 2014, île Flottante, Floating island with villa [scale 1:2], Amsterdam (Erasmuspark), 2014
- 2014, Ein goldener berg", installation during group exhibition, Neue kunst in alten garten, Landschaftsgärten des Calenberger Landes bei Hannover, Germany
- 2014, Close to Nature, 2014, installation for group exhibition ‘Zomeren op de buitenplaats’ on landgoed Beekestijn, Velsen Zuid
- 2013, Gallery Cascade, installation in "de Fabriek", Eindhoven, the Netherlands,
- 2013, Pink villa Colombia, installation in public domain, Cali, Colombia,
- 2012, a Love declaration in light, light installation on roof of 45-meter-high (148 ft) former GAK building, Amsterdam, the Netherlands,
- 2012, The dancing white man, selfportrait, in permanent collection of municipal theatre Amsterdam, the Netherlands,
- 2011, Under heaven 04, installation in public domain, 1st Location: pond in front of Boijmans van beuningen, Rotterdam, the Netherlands, 2nd location: in pond corner Harry Koningsbergerstraat and Burg. Vening Meineszlaan, the Netherlands.
- 2010, Camping Vertical, installation in public domain, 1st Location: De Wallen in center of Amsterdam, 2nd location: in center of Utrecht, the Netherlands.
- 2009, City Island, site specific installation in public domain, Location: de Markt, Nieuwegein, the Netherlands.
- 2009, Under heaven 02, site specific installation in public domain, Location: Wiltzanglaan, Amsterdam, the Netherlands.
- 2008, The surrender of Reynard the Fox, installation in the Green Heart of the Netherlands.
- 2008, The dancing white man, installation in collection of artist. Amsterdam, NL.
- 2008, Abstede Damacy, object in neighborhood in Utrecht based on the game Katamari Damacy
- 2007, Great apes, exhibition in Second gallery. Boston, Massachusetts, U.S.A.
- 2006, Gran False, Geranium deluxe, Ragga tone selecta; installations for group show about mobile phones. Arti et Amicitiae, Amsterdam, NL.
- 2005, Back up, a 3D game and installations build out of the game. Library Universiteit van Amsterdam, NL.
- 2004, Under Heaven, a 9-meter-high (30 ft) tree with tree house on the 50-meter-high (160 ft) Stedelijk Museum. Amsterdam, NL.
- 2004, Under Heaven, build a fata morgana under a viaduct in Amsterdam Bijlmer, NL.
- 2004, Private room 02, talking toilet, de Balie, Amsterdam, NL.
- 2002, Blind Poetry, projections from a car equipped with video projector, Moscow, Russia.

=== Dept ===
Dept was an art,- and design,- collective from 1996 till 2001.

Existing out of P. du Bois Reymond, M. Klaverstein and L. van Munster.

DEPT created graphic design, installations and video works. They created art installations combining electronic and traditional media, and created large scale media-environments for art performances and large club events. The dept site is incorporated in Graphic Design Museum Breda in 2008.

- 2000, My Bricks Rule, interactive installation for the exhibition "For Real" in the Stedelijk Museum Amsterdam
- 2000, BEZET, designs for plastic bags, purchased by MOMA, San Francisco
- 2000, Project 2000, videoclip for a Dutch band,
- 1999, FUSION ATTACK, solo exhibition for MU Art Foundation, Eindhoven
- 1999, On the short list for Most Beautiful Books 1998, for Cold Fusion catalogue, exhibited in Stedelijk Museum, Amsterdam
- 1999, Radical Mixing, audio performance during Serial Drillers evening in Club de Ville, Amsterdam
- 1999, BIG SWITCH, installation for telephone company KPN Amsterdam
- 1997, two stamps designed for the PTT post company the Netherlands
- 1996, Design flyers and website for club Roxy in Amsterdam

== Sources ==
=== Print ===
==== Books ====
- Space Craft. Fleeting Architecture and hideouts. Lucas Feiress, Die Gestalten Verlag, Berlin 2007. ISBN 978-3-89955-192-1.
- Debates & Credits Book and DVD. Eric Kluitenberg, Uitgeverij De Balie, Amsterdam 2003. ISBN 90-6617-298-3.
- Deep sites intelligent innovation in contemporary web design, Max Bruinsma, Thames & Hudson, 2003 ISBN 0-500-28384-2.
- False Flat. Aron Betsky with Adam Eeuwens, Phaidon, ISBN 0-7148-4069-6.

==== Secondary sources ====
- 包装与设计.,'荷兰艺术家Leonard van Munster', 2008-05-15 00:00 [点击率:2826]. ISSN 1007-4759
- De Volkskrant. 'Nergens aankomen / paradijselijke kunst onder de snelweg' in De Volkskrant. May 23, 2009.
- Loorbach, Liedewij. 'Fata Morgana tussen schotels en beton.' in Het Parool. May 20, 2009.
- Post, Gerrit (May 23, 2009). "Onbereikbaar geluk onder een lelijk viaduct" (in Dutch). Trouw.nl.
- Hoedemakers, Véronique. 'Fantaseren over de ultieme stad' in [LUCASX 2009#4]. October, 2009.
- NRC Handelsblad. 'Mobieltjes laten geraniums dansen' in NRC Handelsblad. July 23, 2006.

=== Online ===
- Weekblad van de Technische Universiteit van Delft (The Netherlands, 01-11-07)
- UBA.UVA.nl, Interactive artproject in Libraries of the Universiteit van Amsterdam] (The Netherlands, januari 2005)
- ANP, volkskrant.nl "Kunstenaar tikt viezeriken op vingers in De Volkskrant (The Netherlands, 2004-08-26)
- Kluitenberg, Eric debates.nl "Look at what the mirror is saying!" (Russia, Ekaterinburg and Moscow, October, 2002)
- Debates.nl, "The mischievous adventures of The Activator" (Russia, Ekaterinburg and Moscow, October, 2002)
- Debates.nl, BeamMobile in Moscow, (Russia, Moscow, October, 2002)

=== Television ===
- Pauw en Witteman, 30 November 2012
- KunstUur- ned. 2(2009-10-10) by de AVRO (The Netherlands)Vimeo.com
