= Saint Pépin =

Saint Pepin or Saint Pépin may refer to:

- Saint Pepin of Landen
- St. Pepin (grape), a grape variety

== See also ==
- Pippin (disambiguation)
