= Klaas Gubbels =

Dutch painter and sculptor

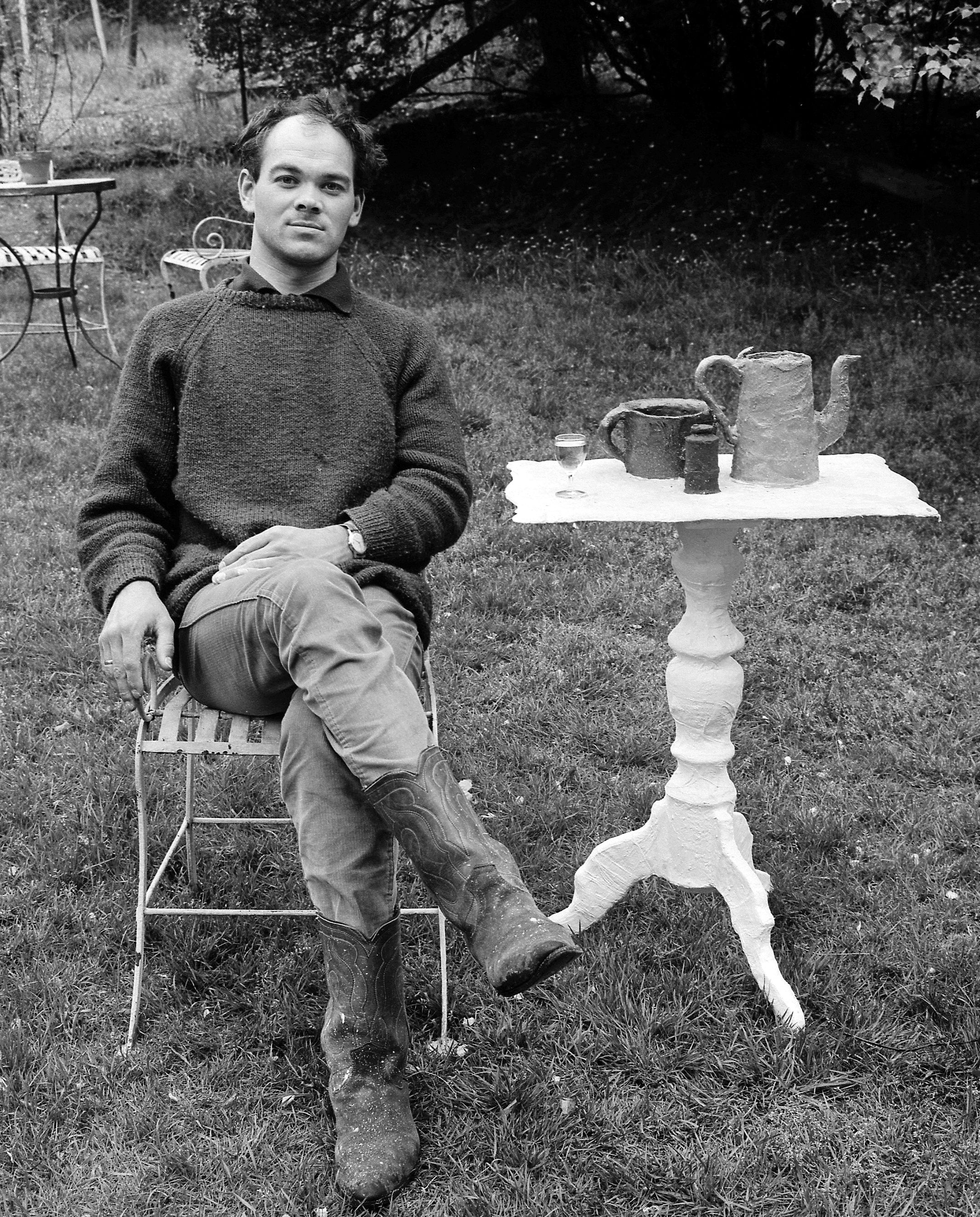
Klaas Gubbels

Klaas Gubbels (born 1934) is a Dutch painter and sculptor with a special love of coffeepots.

== Biography ==
He was born in Rotterdam and in 1954 he became assistant to Wally Elenbaas and Louis van Roode. In 1959-1960 he became assistant to Marius van Beek and bronze worker Dick Grossman. He became a member of the Gemeenschap Beeldende Kunstenaars (GBK) in 1963. His works, which include large murals as well as small prints, often depict a teapot, usually placed on a table. He lives in Arnhem.

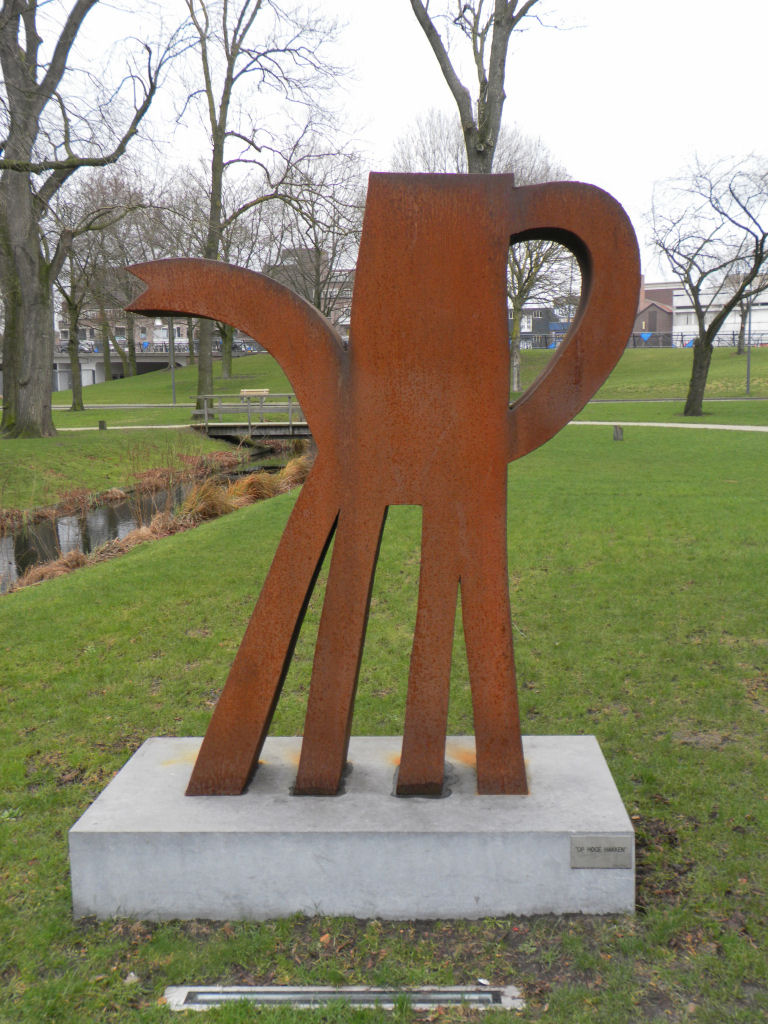
High heels, Kasteelplein, garden of Castle Helmond

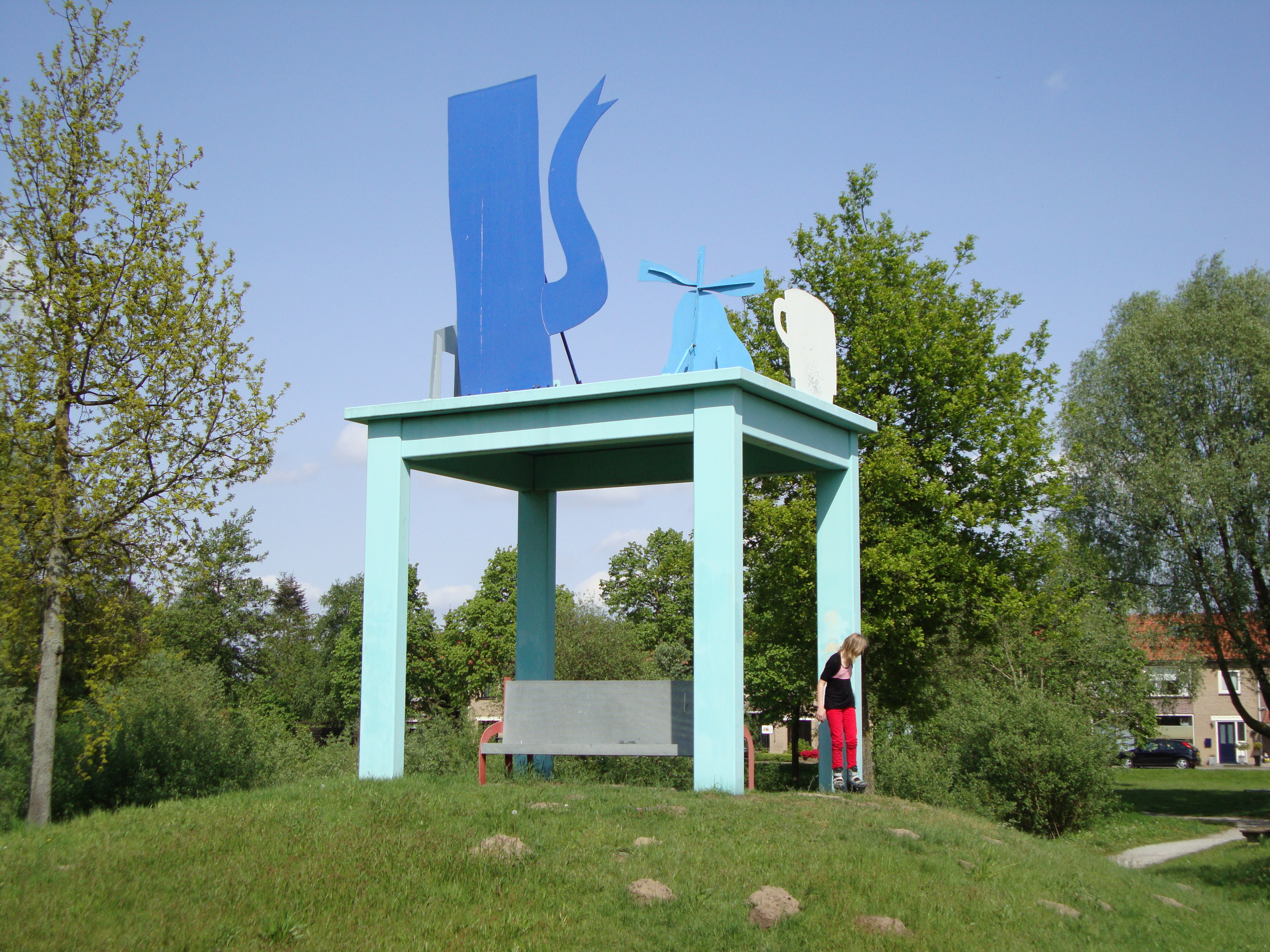
Table, Wychen

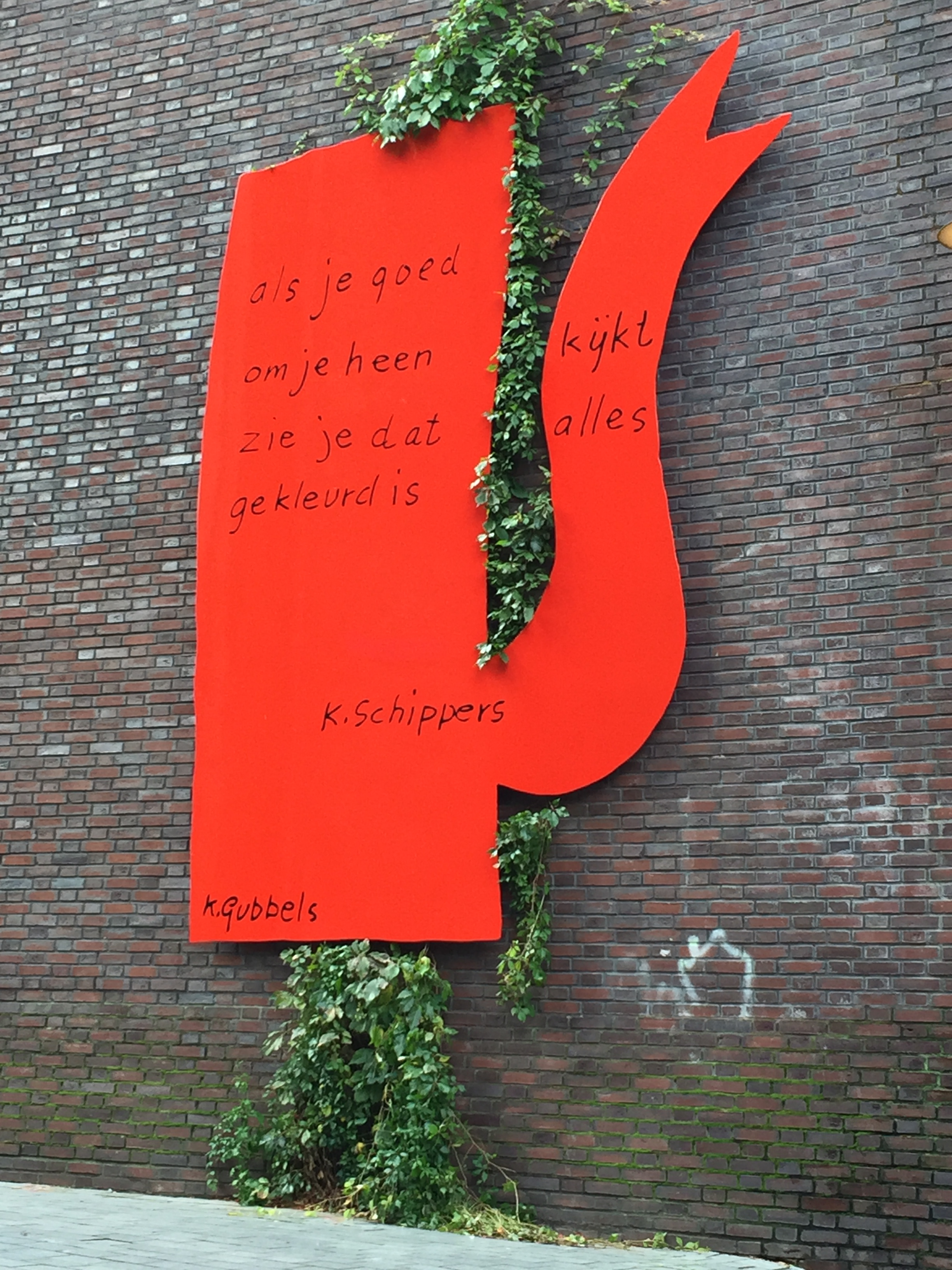
Coffee pot mural, Nijmegen
