= List of Picasso artworks 1911–1920 =

== Gallery ==
Pablo Picasso, 1910–11, Guitariste, La mandoliniste (Woman playing guitar or mandolin), oil on canvas

Pablo Picasso, 1911, La Femme au Violon, oil on canvas, private collection, on long-term loan to Bavarian State Painting Collections, Pinakothek der Moderne, Munich

Pablo Picasso, c.1911, Le Guitariste. Reproduced in Du "Cubisme" (black and white photographic reproduction)

Pablo Picasso, 1911, Woman with a Guitar by the Piano, oil on canvas, exhibited at Centre for Modern and Contemporary Art, Veletrzni (Trades Fair) Palace, Prague

Pablo Picasso, 1911, Mandolin and Glass of Pernod, oil on canvas, National Gallery, Prague

Pablo Picasso, 1911, Still Life with a Bottle of Rum, oil on canvas, 61.3 x 50.5 cm, Metropolitan Museum of Art, New York

Pablo Picasso, 1911, The Poet (Le poète), oil on linen, 131.2 × 89.5 cm (51 5/8 × 35 1/4 in), The Solomon R. Guggenheim Foundation, Peggy Guggenheim Collection, Venice

Pablo Picasso, 1911, Clarinet (Still Life with a Clarinet on a Table), oil on canvas, exhibited at Centre for Modern and Contemporary Art, Veletrzni (Trades Fair) Palace, Prague

Pablo Picasso, 1911–12, L'Homme à la clarinette (Man with a Clarinette), oil on canvas, 106 x 69 cm, Museo Thyssen-Bornemisza, Madrid

Pablo Picasso, 1911–12, L'homme à la mandoline (The Mandolin Player), oil on canvas, 100.5 x 69.5 cm, Beyeler Foundation, Riehen, Switzerland

Pablo Picasso, 1911–12, L'Arlesienne, oil on canvas, 71.3 x 54 cm, private collection

Pablo Picasso, 1911–12, Buffalo Bill, oil on canvas, 46 x 33 cm

Pablo Picasso, 1911–12, Violon (Violin), oil on canvas, 100 x 73 cm (oval), Kröller-Müller Museum, Otterlo, Netherlands. This painting from the collection of Wilhelm Uhde was confiscated by the French state and sold at the Hôtel Drouot in 1921

Pablo Picasso, 1912, Violon, verre, pipe et encrier (Souvenir of Le Havre), oil on canvas, 81 x 54 cm, National Gallery in Prague, Czech Republic

Pablo Picasso, 1912, Violon, verre, pipe et encrier (Souvenir of Le Havre), oil on canvas, 81 x 54 cm, National Gallery in Prague, Czech Republic

Pablo Picasso, 1912, Le poète (The Poet), oil on canvas, 59.9 x 47.8 cm, Kunstmuseum Basel

Pablo Picasso, 1912, Violin and Grapes, oil on canvas, 61 x 50.8 cm, Museum of Modern Art, New York

Pablo Picasso, 1912, Le Verre d'Absinthe (Absinthe and Cards, Verre de Pernod et cartes), oil on canvas, 35 x 27 cm, National Gallery, Prague

Pablo Picasso, 1912, Les oiseaux morts (Los pájaros muertos), oil on canvas, 46 x 65 cm, Museo Nacional Centro de Arte Reina Sofía

Pablo Picasso, 1912, Le violon (Jolie Eva), oil on canvas, 60 x 81 cm, Staatsgalerie Stuttgart

Pablo Picasso, 1912–14, La bouteille de Bass (The Bass Bottle), oil on canvas, 107.5 x 65.5 cm, Museo del Novecento, Milan

Pablo Picasso, 1912–13, Guitare (Guitar), oil and charcoal on canvas, oval, 72.4 x 60 cm, National Museum of Art, Architecture and Design, Oslo

Pablo Picasso, 1913, Violon accroché au mur (Violin Hanging on the Wall), oil, spackle with sand, enamel, and charcoal on canvas, 65 x 46 cm, Museum of Fine Arts Berne

Pablo Picasso, 1913–14, Woman in a Chemise in an Armchair, Femme en chemise assise dans un fauteuil (Eva), oil on canvas, 149.9 x 99.4 cm, Leonard A. Lauder Cubist Collection, Metropolitan Museum of Art

Pablo Picasso, 1913, Bouteille, clarinette, violon, journal, verre, 55 x 45 cm. This painting from the collection of Wilhelm Uhde was confiscated by the French state and sold at the Hôtel Drouot in 1921

Pablo Picasso, 1913, L'Arlequin, Céret (Harlequin), oil on canvas, 120.1 x 77.9 cm, Gemeentemuseum Den Haag

Pablo Picasso, 1913, Compotier avec fruits, violon et verre (Bowl with Fruit, Violin, and Wineglass), charcoal, chalk, watercolor, oil paint, and coarse charcoal or pigment in binding medium on applied papers, mounted on cardboard, 64.8 x 49.5 cm (25 1/2 x 19 1/2 inches), Philadelphia Museum of Art

Pablo Picasso, 1913–14, Le guéridon (Nature morte, Guitares), oil on canvas, 130.2 x 89.1 cm, Kunstmuseum Basel

Pablo Picasso, 1913–14, Head (Tête), cut and pasted colored paper, gouache and charcoal on paperboard, 43.5 x 33 cm, Scottish National Gallery of Modern Art, Edinburgh

Pablo Picasso, 1913–14, Student with a Newspaper, plaster, oil, Conté crayon, and sand on canvas, 73 x 59.7 cm, Metropolitan Museum of Art

Pablo Picasso, 1913–14, L'Homme aux cartes (Card Player), oil on canvas, 108 x 89.5 cm, Museum of Modern Art, New York

Pablo Picasso, 1913–14, Ma Jolie, Nature Morte (Musique), oil on canvas, 53.7 × 65.1 cm. Indianapolis Museum of Art

Pablo Picasso, 1914, Ma Jolie (Pipe, verre, as de trèfle, bouteille de Bass, guitare, dé), oil on canvas, 45 x 41 cm, private collection

Pablo Picasso, 1914, Instruments de musique et tête de mort, oil on canvas, 43.8 x 61.8 cm, Lille Métropole Museum of Modern, Contemporary and Outsider Art

Pablo Picasso, spring 1914, Pipe, Glass, Bottle of Vieux Marc (Pipe, verre, bouteille de Vieux Marc), mixed media, 73.2 x 59.4 cm, Peggy Guggenheim Collection, Venice

Pablo Picasso, 1914, Pipe, Glass, Bottle of Rum, 40 x 52.7 cm, Museum of Modern Art

Pablo Picasso, 1914, Composition à la guitare (lithograph, 47,5 x 36 cm, numbered HC I LX)

Pablo Picasso, 1914–15, Nature morte au compotier (Still Life with Compote and Glass), oil on canvas, 63.5 x 78.7 cm (25 x 31 in), Columbus Museum of Art, Ohio

Pablo Picasso, 1915, Musical Instruments (Instruments de musique), watercolor and charcoal on laid paper, 19.4 x 23.2 cm, Barnes Foundation

Pablo Picasso, 1916, Still-life with Door, Guitar and Bottles, oil on canvas, 152.4 × 205.7 cm, Statens Museum for Kunst, Copenhagen

Pablo Picasso, 1916, L'anis del mono (Bottle of Anis del Mono), oil on canvas, 46 x 54.6 cm, Detroit Institute of Arts, Michigan

Pablo Picasso, reproduced in L'Elan, Number 10, 1 December 1916

Pablo Picasso, Femme assise dans un fauteuil (Woman sitting in an armchair), reproduced in L'Elan, Number 9, 12 February 1916

Pablo Picasso, 1916, Guitare, clarinette et bouteille sur une table (Guitar, Clarinet, and Bottle on a Pedestal Table), dimensions and whereabouts unknown

Pablo Picasso, 1917, Harlequin (Arlequín), oil on canvas, 116 x 90 cm, Museo Picasso, Barcelona

Pablo Picasso, 1918, Portrait d'Olga dans un fauteuil (Olga in an Armchair), oil on canvas, 130 x 88.8 cm, Musée Picasso, Paris

Pablo Picasso, 1918, Portrait de Madame Rosenberg et sa fille, 130 x 95 cm, Musée Picasso, Paris

Pablo Picasso, 1918, Arlequin (Harlequin)

Pablo Picasso, 1918, Arlequin au violon (Harlequin with Violin), oil on canvas, 142 x 100.3 cm, The Cleveland Museum of Art, Ohio

Pablo Picasso, 1918, Pierrot, oil on canvas, 92.7 x 73 cm, Museum of Modern Art

Pablo Picasso, 1918, Arlequin jouant de la guitare (Harlequin)

Pablo Picasso, published in Klingen, Volume 1, Number 10, June 1918

Pablo Picasso, 1918, Still Life, oil on canvas, 97.2 x 130.2 cm, National Gallery of Art

Pablo Picasso, 1919, Sleeping Peasants, gouache, watercolor and pencil on paper, 31.1 x 48.9 cm, Museum of Modern Art, New York

Pablo Picasso, 1919, Paysage (Landscape with Dead and Live Trees), oil on canvas, 49.4 x 65.4 cm, Bridgestone Museum of Art, Tokyo

Pablo Picasso, c.1919, Nature morte au pichet et aux pommes (still-life with a pitcher and apples), work on paper, dimensions and whereabouts unknown

Pablo Picasso, c.1919, Ballerinas (Three Dancers), work on paper (slightly cropped), dimensions and whereabouts unknown

== List of works ==
=== A ===
- Acrobatie érotique
- Acteurs et audience dans le théâtre
- Apollinaire, l'artilleur
- Arlequin
- Arlequin à la guitare (2)
- Arlequin à la guitare (Si tu veux)
- Arlequin à la guitare, Avignon
- Arlequin assis à la guitare
- Arlequin jouant de la guitare
- Arlequin tenant une bouteille et femme
- Arlésienne
- Autoportrait (2)

=== B ===
- Balcon avec vue sur mer
- Bec à gaz et guitare
- Boite peinte
- Bouteille d'anis Del Mono et compotier avec raisins
- Bouteille de Bass et guitare
- Bouteille de Bass, clarinette, guitare, violon, journal, as de trèfle
- Bouteille de Bass, guitare, as de trèfle
- Bouteille de Bass, verre et journal
- Bouteille de Bass, verre, paquet de tabac, carte de visite
- Bouteille de Malaga
- Bouteille de Pernod et verre
- Bouteille de porto et verre
- Bouteille de Vieux Marc, verre et journal
- Bouteille et verre
- Bouteille et verre sur un guéridon
- Bouteille sur une table
- Bouteille, clarinette, violon, journal, verre
- Bouteille, guitare, pipe
- Bouteille, tasse, journal
- Bouteille, verre et compotier sur une table
- Bouteille, verre et journal sur une table
- Bouteille, verre et pipe
- Bouteille, verre et violon
- Bouteille, verre, fourchette
- Bouteille, verre, journal
- Buffalo Bill
- Buste de femme

=== C ===
- Cantatrice
- Cartes à jouer, bouteille, verre
- Cartes à jouer, verres, bouteille de rhum ('Vive la France')
- Cinq baigneuses (Baigneuses regardant un avion)
- Composition
- Composition à la guitare
- Composition au violon
- Composition géométrique
- Compotier
- Compotier avec fruits, mandoline, verre sur une table dans un paysage
- Compotier avec fruits, violon et verre
- Compotier avec poire et pomme
- Compotier avec raisins sur une table devant une fenêtre
- Compotier et poire coupée
- Compotier sur une table
- Compotier sur une table devant une fenêtre
- Compotier, grappe de raisin, poire coupée
- Compotier, verre, bouteille, fruits (Nature morte verte)
- Corbeille de fruits
- Couple
- Couple de danseurs
- Couteau, fourchette, menu, bouteille, jambon
- Crane et pichet

=== D ===
- Danseuse
- Danseuse assise (Olga Picasso)
- Danseuses, d'après une photographie
- Deux baigneuses
- Deux baigneuses assises
- Deux femmes
- Deux femmes nues
- Deux nus allongés

=== E ===
- Elements d'étude
- Études
- Etudiant au journal

=== F ===
- Femme à la guitare
- Femme à la guitare assise
- Femme à la guitare près d'un piano
- Femme allongée
- Femme assise
- Femme assise à la guitare
- Femme assise à la mandoline
- Femme assise accoudée
- Femme assise au chapeau
- Femme assise avec livre
- Femme assise dans un fauteuil (5)
- Femme assise dans un fauteuil rouge
- Femme assise dans un fauteuil (Eva)
- Femme au chapeau à plumes
- Femme au chapeau dans un fauteuil
- Femme au chapeau de velours dans un fauteuil et colombes
- Femme couchée au bord de mer
- Femme dans un fauteuil
- Femme debout
- Femme debout accoudée (Olga)
- Femme en chemise assise dans un fauteuil
- Femme en chemise dans un fauteuil
- Femme en chemise dans un fauteuil [Étude]
- Femme en costume espagnol (La Salchichona)
- Femme et soldat Étude
- Femme lisant (Olga)
- Femme lisant (Olga)
- Femme nue ('J'aime Eva')
- Femme nue (6)
- Femme nue assise dans un fauteuil
- Femme nue dans un fauteuil et homme à la moustache
- Femme-Guitare
- Fenêtre ouverte sur la rue de Penthieure
- Fêtes de Céret
- Fillette au cerceau

=== G ===
- Grappe de raisin
- Grappe de raisins, pipe, verre et journal
- Grenade, verre, pipe
- Guéridon avec guitare
- Guéridon avec guitare et partition
- Guéridon et guitare
- Guéridon, verres, tasses, mandoline
- Guitare
- Guitare 'J'aime Eva
- Guitare (1)
- Guitare (2)
- Guitare (3)
- Guitare et bouteille de Bass
- Guitare et bouteille de Bass [Étude]
- Guitare et compotier
- Guitare et compotier sur une table carrée
- Guitare et cruche sur une table
- Guitare et feuille de musique
- Guitare et partition sur un guéridon
- Guitare et tasse à café
- Guitare sur un guéridon
- Guitare sur une table
- Guitare sur une table II
- Guitare verte et rose
- Guitare verte qui étend
- Guitare, bouteille et verre sur une table ronde
- Guitare, carte à jouer, verre, journal
- Guitare, clarinette et bouteille sur une table
- Guitare, crâne et journal
- Guitare, journal, verre et bouteille
- Guitare, partition, verre
- Guitare, verre et journal
- Guitare, verre et pipe
- Guitare, verre, bouteille de vieux marc
- Guitariste
- Guitariste (La mandoliniste)
- Guitariste avec partition
- Guitariste dans un fauteuil

=== H ===
- Homme
- Homme à chapeau
- Homme à la clarinette
- Homme à la guitare
- Homme à la guitare et femme
- Homme à la mandoline (2)
- Homme à la pipe
- Homme à la pipe (Le fumeur)
- Homme à la tenora avec livre
- Homme accoudé sur une table
- Homme assis
- Homme assis accoudé
- Homme assis dans un fauteuil
- Homme au chapeau
- Homme au chapeau à la pipe
- Homme au chapeau accoudé sur une table
- Homme au chapeau jouant de la guitare
- Homme au chapeau melon assis dans un fauteuil
- Homme au chapeau tenant une guitare
- Homme au chapeau tenant une guitare
- Homme aux mains croisées accoudé à une table
- Homme avec guitare
- Homme lisant un journal
- Homme-Manteau (Homme à la cheminée)

=== I ===
- Instruments de musique
- Instruments de musique et compotier sur un guéridon
- Instruments de musique et compotier sur une table
- Instruments de musique et tête de mort
- Instruments de musique sur une table
- Instruments et bol de fruits devant une fenêtre avec un avion

=== J ===
- Jambon, verre, bouteille de vieux marc, journal
- Jeune fille au chapeau les mains croisées
- Joueur de cartes

=== L ===
- L'arlequin de Barcelone
- L'artiste et son modèle
- L'atelier de l'artiste rue de La Boétie
- L'Avenue Frochot, vu de l'atelier de Picasso
- L'écolière
- L'Égyptien
- L'enlèvement
- L'étagère
- L'étudiant a la pipe
- L'éventail (L'Indépendant)
- L'Homme aux cartes
- L'italienne
- La clarinette
- La coquille Saint-Jacques ('Notre Avenir est dans l'air')
- La crucifixion
- La Femme au Violon
- La grenade
- La guitare
- La mandoliniste
- La mandoliniste assise
- La pointe de la Cité
- La Rue d'Orchampt
- La sieste
- La table
- La table de l'architecte
- La table devant la fenêtre
- Le bouteille de Rhum
- Le guéridon
- Le journal
- Le ménage Sisley d'apres 'Les Fiancés' d'Auguste Renoir
- Le pigeon
- Le pigeon aux petits pois
- Le poète (The Poet), (1911, Guggenhein), (1912, Kunstmuseum Basel)
- Le Pont-Neuf
- Le rapt (Nessus & Déjanire)
- Le retour du baptême (Le Nain)
- Le verre
- Le verre d'absinthe
- Les amoureux
- Les baigneuses
- Les boxeurs
- Les communiants
- Les échecs
- Les oiseaux morts

=== M ===
- Ma Jolie Mural
- Ma Jolie|Ma Jolie (Femme à la guitare)
- Main
- Mandoline et clarinette

=== N ===
- Nature morte
- Nature morte à l'oiseau mort
- Nature morte à la bouteille et à la guitare
- Nature morte à la colombe (Oiseau sur une table)
- Nature morte à la guitare
- Nature morte à la guitare et Pulcinella
- Nature morte au guéridon
- Nature morte au guéridon et à l'assiette
- Nature morte au pichet et aux pommes
- Nature morte au verre
- Nature morte aux bouteille 'Vie de Marc'
- Nature morte aux fleurs de lis
- Nature morte avec bouteille et verre
- Nature morte devant une fenêtre
- Nature morte devant une fenêtre à Saint-Raphaël
- Nature morte espagnole
- Nature morte sur un piano ('CORT')
- Notre Avenir est dans l'Air
- Nu debout
- Nu debout de profil
- Nu debout se regardant dans un miroir

=== O ===
- Oiseau sur une branche
- Olga
- Olga au chapeau à plumes
- Olga lisant assise dans un fauteuil

=== P ===
- Palette, pinceaux, livre de Victor Hugo
- Parade (études pour le rideau de scène)
- Parade: Costume de manager américain
- Parade: Costume de manager français
- Partition et guitare
- Paysage à l'arbre mort et vif
- Paysage aux affiches
- Paysage de Céret
- Paysage de Juan-les-Pins
- Personage (5)
- Personage arlequinesque (Arlequin)
- Personage au compotier
- Pierrot
- Pierrot au loup
- Pierrot et arlequin
- Pierrot et arlequin à une terrasse de café
- Pipe et carte
- Pipe et partition
- Pipe et verre
- Pipe, bouteille de Bass, dé
- Pipe, dé, journal
- Pipe, Glass, Bottle of Vieux Marc
- Pipe, verre et paquet de tabac
- Pipe, verre, as de trèfle, bouteille de Bass, guitare, dé ('Ma Jolie')
- Pipe, verre, boîte d'allumettes
- Pipe, verre, bouteille de rhum
- Pipe, verre, bouteille de Vieux Marc ('Lacerba')
- Pomme
- Port d'Antibes
- Portrait d' Erik Satie
- Portrait d'Igor Stravinsky
- Portrait d'Olga (3)
- Portrait d'Olga à la mantille
- Portrait d'Olga dans un fauteuil
- Portrait d'un homme barbu accoudé à une sellette
- Portrait d'un jeune homme
- Portrait de Diaghilev & Seligsberg
- Portrait de femme (Olga)
- Portrait de Guillaume Apollinaire
- Portrait de jeune fille
- Portrait de Léonide Massine
- Portrait de Madame Rosenberg et sa fille
- Portrait de Pierre-Auguste Renoir
- Poulet, bouteille et verre
- Projet pour le costume de Pulcinella
- Projet pour Pulcinella

=== Q ===
- Quatre baigneuses

=== R ===
- Restaurant
- Rideau pour le ballet Parade

=== S ===
- Sept danseuses
- Sept danseuses don't Olga Picasso au premier plan
- Souvenir du Havre
- Still life with Chair Caning

=== T ===
- Tenant une bouteille de vin
- Tête
- Tête d'arlequin
- Tête d'homme
- Tête d'homme au chapeau
- Tête d'homme moustachu
- Tête d'homme moustachu ('Kou')
- Tête de femme
- Tête de jeune fille
- Tête de jeune fille au chapeau garni de raisins
- Tête II
- Tricorne [Étude]
- Trois baigneuses
- Trois baigneuses, Juan-les-Pins
- Trois danseuses
- Trois nus

=== V ===
- Vase, pipe, paquet de tabac
- Verre
- Verre aux chalumeaux
- Verre d'absinthe
- Verre de Pernod et cartes
- Verre et as de trèfle (Hommage à Max Jacob)
- Verre et bouteille de Bass
- Verre et bouteille de rhum empaillée
- Verre et bouteille de Suze
- Verre et dé
- Verre et demijohn
- Verre et paquet de tabac sur une table
- Verre et pipe
- Verre et pomme
- Verre et pomme sur une table
- Verre sur un guéridon
- Verre sur une table
- Verre, as de trèfle et dé
- Verre, as de trèfle, bouteille sur une table
- Verre, bouquet, guitare, bouteille
- Verre, bouteille de Bass, as de trèfle
- Verre, bouteille de vin, paquet de tabac, journal
- Verre, dé et journal
- Verre, dé, journal
- Verre, guitare, bouteille
- Verre, journal et dé
- Verre, journal, bouteille
- Verres et bouteilles
- Violiniste
- Violon « Jolie Eva »
- Violon (4)
- Violon accroché au mur (Violin Hanging on the Wall)
- Violon au café (Violon, verre, bouteille)
- Violon de Céret
- Violon et bouteille sur une table
- Violon et clarinette
- Violon et feuille de musique
- Violon et guitare
- Violon et raisins
- Violon et verres sur une table
- Violon pyramidal
- Violon vertical
- Violon, partition et journal
- Visage de femme
- Vive la France
- Vue sur le monument de Colomb
