= The Lighthouse in Westkapelle =

Painting by Piet Mondriaan

Lighthouse in Westkapelle
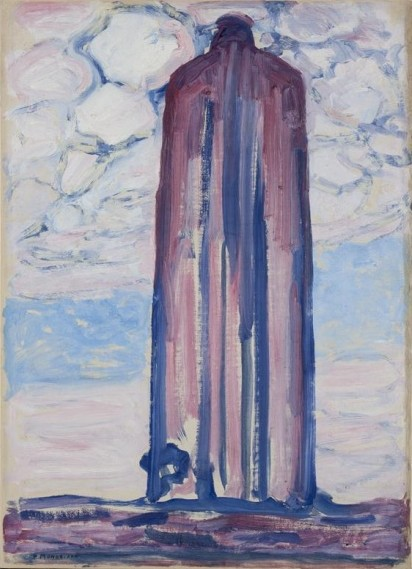
- Artist: Piet Mondrian
- Year: 1908
- Medium: oil paint, canvas
- Dimensions: 71 cm (28 in) × 52 cm (20 in)
- Location: Kunstmuseum Den Haag

The Lighthouse at Westkapelle is an oil on canvas painting by the Dutch artist Piet Mondrian, from 1908. It is held in the Kunstmuseum Den Haag.

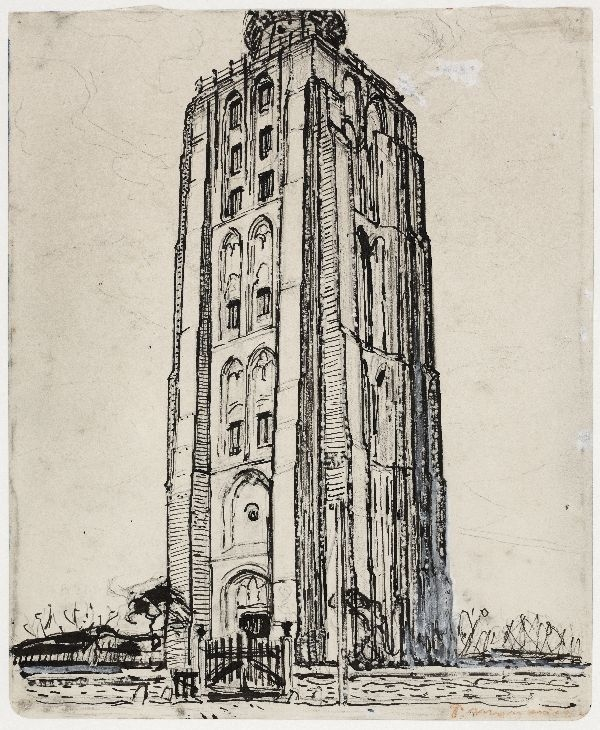
A later drawing by Piet Mondriaan on the same subject. The Lighthouse at Westkapelle. 1909. Ink, chalk and gouache on paper. Kunstmuseum Den Haag.

The painting shows the Lighthouse at Westkapelle also called, in Dutch, the Westkapelle Hoog. During holidays in Zeeland, Mondrian made five drawings and paintings of this lighthouse. As he did earlier with drawings of the movement of the river Gein, Mondrian investigated the possibilities of different media: from very detailed to very impressionistic. This version from 1908 is the most abstract, giving the appearance of having been completed in a few brief brushstrokes. In reality, Mondrian painted it over a longer period, possibly also after his return after holidays to Amsterdam. After his second stay in Zeeland, he indicated in a letter to the violinist Aletta de Iong aan ‘to make a little progress with some things from Zeeland, which I make entirely to my liking’.

== Attribution and provenance ==
The work is signed at the bottom left with ‘P. MONDRIAAN’. It arrived in the collection of the Kunstmuseum in 1971, a bequest from the collector Sal Slijper.
