= A Farmhouse Behind A Fence =

Painting by Piet Mondrian

A Farmhouse Behind a Fence
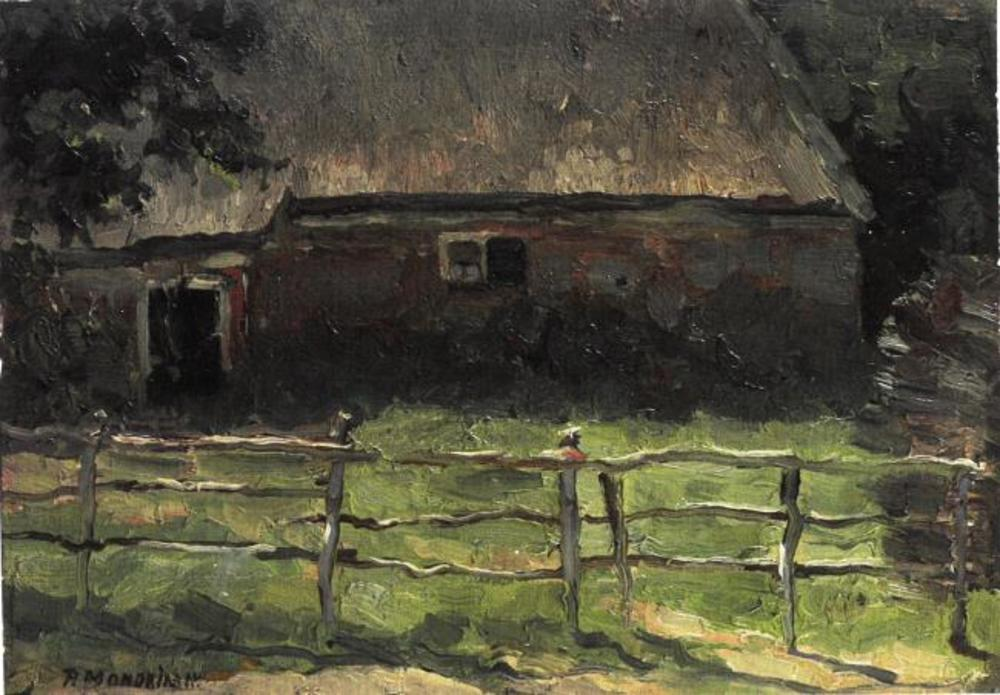
- Artist: Piet Mondrian
- Year: c. 1904
- Medium: oil paint, canvas
- Dimensions: 20.5 cm (8.1 in) × 29.1 cm (11.5 in)

A Farmhouse Behind A Fence is an oil on canvas painting by the Dutch artist Piet Mondrian, from 1904. It was completed early in his career, in 1904, when "the artist abruptly broke from his former life and went into rural seclusion in Brabant, a province in southern Netherlands." He painted numerous canvases on a rural theme: "in his initial public appearances as a professional artist Mondrian was more concerned with supplying a product that would sell than defining his own personal style."

Such paintings were before he developed the now more familiar abstract visual approach of the De Stijl movement. Nevertheless, the painting still shows the beginning of Mondrian's evolution: during this period "he produced paintings of traditional subject matter—Dutch farmhouses and windmills and rivers and forests—but rendered these themes in a very untraditional way ... [he] composed his representations, rather, out of bold abstract planes and broad brushstrokes of saturated colour."

Despite the existence of a signature at the bottom left of the canvas, it was only attributed to Mondrian in 2004, by the art historian Joop Joosten. The painting was added to the collection of the Kunstmuseum, in The Hague, in 2020. It was acquired from a private collection hanging in Hoorn.
