= Femme et pot de moutarde =

1910 painting by Pablo Picasso

Woman with mustard pot
- Year: 1910
- Dimensions: 73 cm (29 in) × 60 cm (24 in)
- Location: Kunstmuseum Den Haag
- Accession no.: 0333239

Femme et pot de moutarde (English: Woman with Mustard Pot) is a 1910 painting by Pablo Picasso. The portrait shows Picasso's lover of the time, Fernande Olivier. The painting formed part of The Armory Show in New York, that introduced North America to Picasso and several other modern painters and sculptors, for a price of US$675.

The painting hangs in the collection of the Kunstmuseum Den Haag.
