= Ina Hooft =

Dutch artist (1894–1994)

- Born: Gerardina Anna Allegonda Martina Hooft; 27 January 1894; The Hague, Netherlands
- Died: 30 March 1994 (aged 100); Laren, Netherlands
- Known for: Painting

Gerardina Anna Allegonda Martina Hooft (1894–1994) was a Dutch painter known for her still lifes.

== Biography ==
Hooft was born on 27 January 1894 in The Hague. She studied at the Akademie van beeldende kunsten (Den Haag) (Royal Academy of Art, The Hague), Académie de la Grande Chaumière (Paris) and De Eerste Nederlandse Vrije Studio. Her teachers included Floris Arntzenius, Francis de Erdely, and Chris de Moor. Hooft taught a number of students including Julia Beelaerts van Blokland, Annie Borst Pauwels, Louise van der Kaay-Danekes, Iet Schokking, and Frederika Wijsenbeek.

Hooft's work was included in the 1939 exhibition and sale Onze Kunst van Heden (Our Art of Today) at the Rijksmuseum in Amsterdam. She was a member of Arti et Amicitiae and the Pulchri Studio.

Hooft died on 30 March 1994 in Laren, North Holland at the age of 100.

Her work is in the Kunstmuseum Den Haag and the Rijksmuseum.
