= Jürgen Partenheimer =

German artist

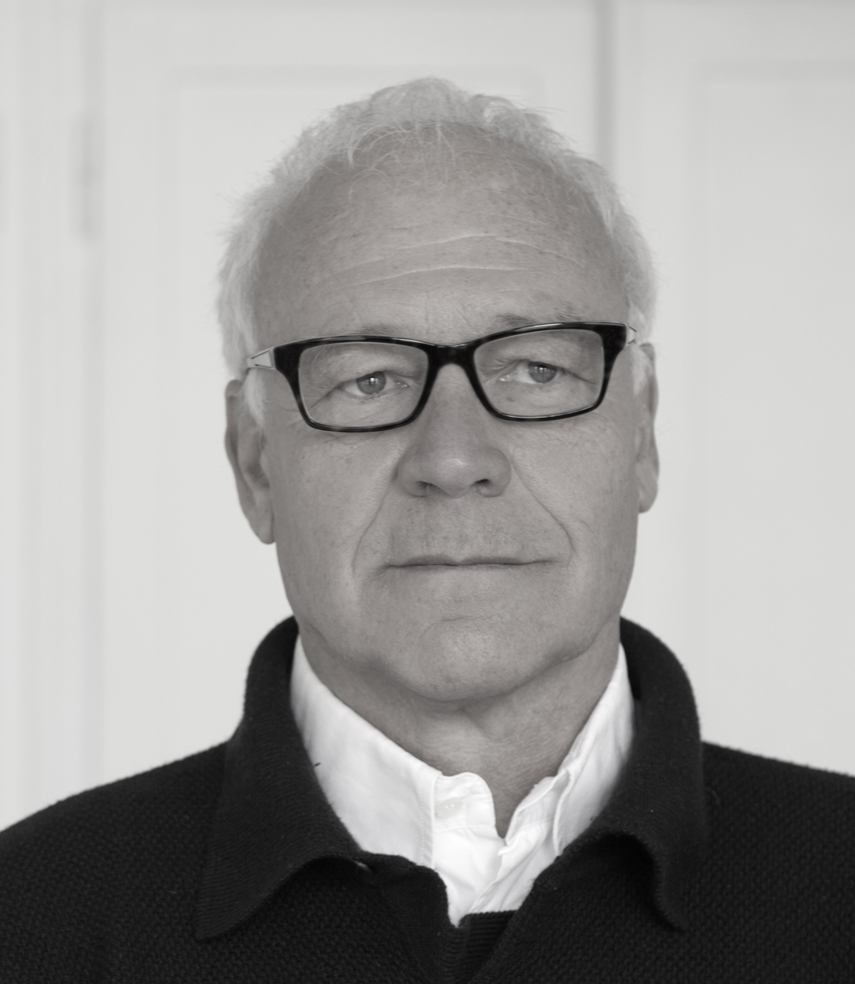
- Born: 14 May 1947 (age 79); Munich, Germany
- Education: LMU Munich; University of Arizona
- Known for: Drawing, painting, sculpture, artists writings
- Movement: Abstract art, conceptual art

Jürgen Partenheimer (born 14 May 1947, in Munich, Germany) is a German artist. His works span a range of media, from painting, drawing, sculpture, printmaking, artists books, texts and installations. He lives and works in Germany and Italy.

== Biography ==
Partenheimer was born and raised in Munich, Bavaria. He studied art history and philosophy at LMU Munich from 1968 to 1976 where he received a PhD in art history in 1976. 1971 he received a Columbus scholarship and studied at the Art Department of the University of Arizona, Tucson. He was reinvited as Teaching Assistant to the University of Arizona in 1972 where he graduated with an MFA in 1973. 1976 Partenheimer received a grant from the State of Bavaria for research studies at Musée d´Art Moderne de la Ville de Paris, France. He moved to Düsseldorf in 1978 and was invited by Richard Demarco for his first show at the Richard Demarco Gallery, Edinburgh in 1979. Partenheimer´s work celebrates an exquisite relation of forms and at the same time, they invite association, which is a supremely supple and versatile act of the imagination. In his oeuvre the artist succeeds uniquely in leaving the idea of an objectively experienced world behind, transforming it into a cognitive act of seeing.

== Exhibitions ==
Partenheimer's first major exhibition in 1983 was organized by the Kunstraum Munich. Partenheimer has since exhibited his work internationally and was included in the XI Paris Biennial (1980), listed as an American artist at the XVI São Paulo Biennial, Nucleus I (1982) and participated in the XLII Venice Biennial (1986). 1988 The National Galerie Berlin organized Partenheimer's first extensive museum show in Germany. In 1998 and 1999 the museums for contemporary art IVAM Valencia and the CGAC Santiago de Compostela in Spain organized comprehensive exhibitions of his work. In 2000, he was the first German contemporary artist who was invited to show his work at the National Museum of Art in Beijing and at the Nanjing Museum in Nanjing. Between 2002 and 2008 the S.M.A.K. Ghent, Staatliche Kunsthalle Karlsruhe, Pinacoteca do Estado de São Paulo, IKON Gallery, Birmingham and Kunstmuseum Bonn organized individual shows. 2014 the Pinakothek der Moderne Munich organized a retrospective exhibition with venues at Deichtorhallen, Collection Falckenberg, Hamburg, Kunstmuseum Den Haag and Contemporary Art Gallery, Vancouver. 2015 Musée Ariana in Geneva showed drawings and 21 porcelain vessels which Partenheimer created upon invitation at the Nymphenburg Porcelain Manufacture in Munich. 2017 he had an exhibition at White Cube Gallery, London, Lichtschwarm including paintings, sculptures, unique ceramics and works on paper dating from 1975−2017. 2021 and 2022 Häusler Contemporary Zurich and Max Goelitz Gallery Munich presented recent paintings, drawings, and sculptures.

== Recognition ==
Partenheimer has been the recipient of many awards including the Grand Award for Visual Art, NRW, Düsseldorf (1980), NEA National Endowment for the Arts Award, New York (1982), Canada Council Grant, Montréal (1982), the Spanish Art Critics Award, Madrid (1995), Guest of Honor, German Academy, Villa Massimo, Rome (2003), First Class Order of Merit, Federal Republic of Germany (2004), Nietzsche-Residency Award, Sils-Maria (2006), Nirox Foundation Residency Award, Johannesburg (2011) and Audain Distinguished Residency Award, Emily Carr University for Art+Design, Vancouver(2014).

== Monographs ==
- Hermann Kern: Jürgen Partenheimer. Der Weg der Nashörner. Fragmente Part II. Munich, 1983, ISBN 3-923874-01-4.
- Thomas Deecke: Jürgen Partenheimer. Der Ort des Bogens, Arbeiten auf Papier. Münster, 1984, ISBN 3-925047-00-X.
- Dieter Honisch: Jürgen Partenheimer. Verwandlung-Heimkehr. Fragmente IV. Berlin. Art Book, Amsterdam, 1988, ISBN 3-88609-258-5.
- Rolf Wedewer : Jürgen Partenheimer. Tönende Schatten. Museum Schloss Morsbroich, Leverkusen; Kunstmuseum St. Gallen; Kunstmuseum Düsseldorf, 1990.
- Werner Hofmann: Jürgen Partenheimer. Vasts apart – Bereiche des Ordnens. Hamburger Kunsthalle, Hamburg, 1990.
- Werner Meyer: Jürgen Partenheimer. Varia – Bilder einer Sammlung. Edition Cantz, 1992, ISBN 3-89322-474-2.
- Beatrice v. Bismarck, Franz Kaiser: Jürgen Partenheimer. Ausgewählte Texte. Frankfurt/The Hague, Edition Cantz, 1993, ISBN 3-89322-539-0.
- Christoph Schreier, Michael Semff: Jürgen Partenheimer. Drucke und Bücher. Bonn/Munich, Richter Verlag, 1994, ISBN 3-929790-07-6.
- Rudi Fuchs: Partenheimer. Cantos, Stedelijk Museum Amsterdam, 1997, ISBN 90-5006-122-2.
- Juan Manuel Bonet: Jürgen Partenheimer. Cantos y otras mentiras. Valencia, Richter Verlag, 1998, ISBN 84-482-1696-2.
- Klaus Schrenk: Jürgen Partenheimer. Fragmente. Karlsruhe, Richter Verlag, 1998, ISBN 3-928762-86-9.
- Miguel Fernandez Cid: Jürgen Partenheimer. Escultura, Pintura y Dibujo. Santiago de Compostela, 1999, ISBN 84-453-2589-2.
- Franz Kaiser: Jürgen Partenheimer. Architecture-Sculpture. Gemeentemuseum The Hague, Richter Verlag, 2000, ISBN 90-6730-118-3.
- Dieter Ronte: CrossMapping. Partenheimer in China. Beijing, Nanjing, Richter Verlag, 2001, ISBN 3-933807-56-5.
- Jan Hoet: Jürgen Partenheimer. La robe des choses. Ghent, Merz, 2002, ISBN 90-76979-08-1.
- Heinz Althöfer, Bazon Brock: Jürgen Partenheimer. Der Schein der Dinge. Gentle Madness . Dortmund, Richter Verlag, 2004, ISBN 3-937572-10-4.
- Maria Linsmann: Jürgen Partenheimer. Künstlerbücher – Artists Books 1970–2003. Wienand Verlag, Cologne, 2004. ISBN 3-87909-848-4.
- Marcelo M. Araujo: Jürgen Partenheimer. Suave Loucura – Gentle Madness. Editora Estação Liberdade, São Paulo, 2005, ISBN 85-7448-103-3.
- Klaus Schrenk: Jürgen Partenheimer. Roma – São Paulo. Zeichnungen-Drawings. Karlsruhe, Richter Verlag, 2006, ISBN 3-937572-53-8.
- Peter André Bloch: Jürgen Partenheimer. Metaphysische Landschaft. Benno Schwabe Verlag, Basel, 2007, ISBN 978-3-7965-2401-1.
- Nigel Prince: Jürgen Partenheimer. Discontinuity, Paradox & Precision. IKON Gallery, Birmingham, 2008, ISBN 978-1-904864-40-0.
- Baudi & Milco Onrust: Jürgen Partenheimer. Works-Renga. Galerie Onrust, Amsterdam, 2012, ISBN 978-90-76135-00-7.
- Jochen Kienbaum: Jürgen Partenheimer. Seeds & Tracks and Folded Spirits. South African Diary. Snoeck Verlag, Cologne, 2013. ISBN 978-3-86442-035-1.
- Klaus Schrenk, Dirk Lukow, Benno Tempel, Nigel Prince: Jürgen Partenheimer. Das Archiv – The Archive. Distanz, Munich /Hamburg/The Hague/Vancouver/ Berlin, 2014, ISBN 978-3-95476-046-6.
- Anne Claire Schumacher: Jürgen Partenheimer – Calliope. Snoeck Verlag, Cologne, 2015, ISBN 978-3-86442-147-1.
- Andrea Schlieker: Jürgen Partenheimer. Lichtschwarm. White Cube, London, 2017, ISBN 978-1-910844-17-5.
- Wolfgang Häusler: Jürgen Partenheimer. Gespräche mit Alexander Kluge, Jan Thorn-Prikker und andere Texte. Snoeck Verlag, Cologne, 2017, ISBN 978-3-86442-205-8.
- Peter Dittmar: Jürgen Partenheimer. Unverloren-Unlost. Edition Dittmar, Berlin, 2018, ISBN 978-3-9815472-6-9.
- Wolfgang Häusler: Jürgen Partenheimer. Verwandlung / Transformation. Häusler Contemporary, Munich, 2019, ISBN 978-3-00-063915-9.
- Bettina Augustin: Jürgen Partenheimer. One Hundred Poets. Mainz, Golden Luft Verlag, 2021, ISBN 978-3-9822844-7-7.

== Gallery ==
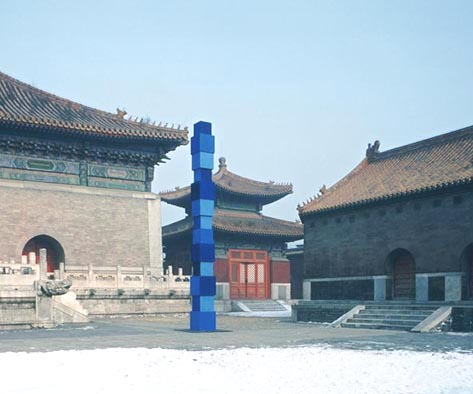
Jürgen Partenheimer, China National Museum of Fine Art, Beijing, "World Axis", Imperial Archives, Forbidden City, Beijing, 2000

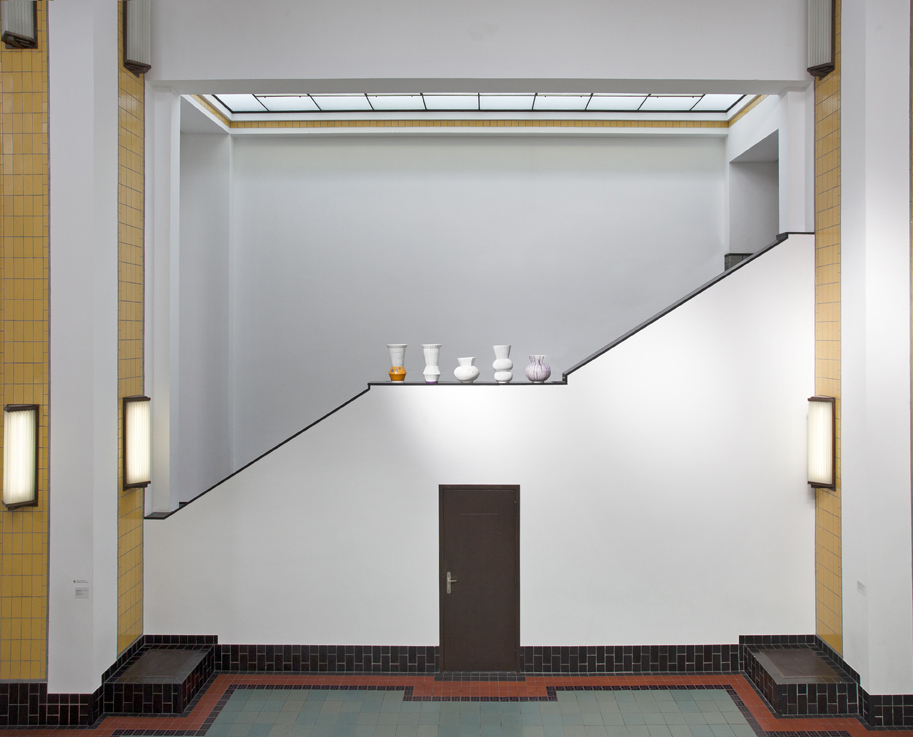
Jürgen Partenheimer, Gemeentemuseum, The Hague

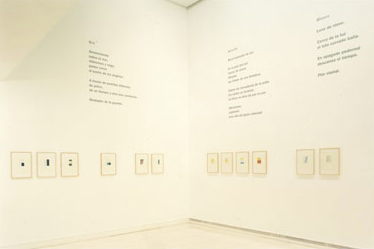
Jürgen Partenheimer, IVAM, Valencia, 1998

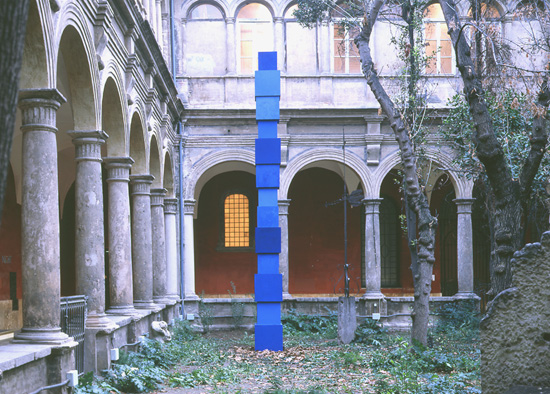
Jürgen Partenheimer, "World Axis", IVAM, Valencia, 1998

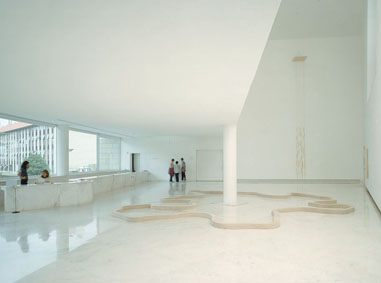
Jürgen Partenheimer, Centro Gallego de Arte Contemporaneo, CGAC, Santiago de Compostela, 1999

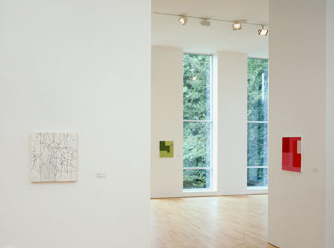
Jürgen Partenheimer, Stedelijk Museum voor Aktuele Kunst, S.M.A.K. Gent, 2002

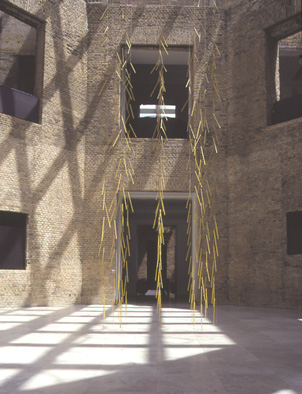
Jürgen Partenheimer, Pinacoteca do Estado de São Paulo, 2004

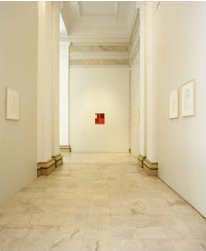
Jürgen Partenheimer, Pinacoteca do Estado de São Paulo, 2004

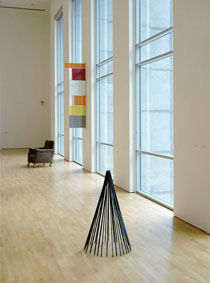
Jürgen Partenheimer, Stedelijk Museum voor Actuele Kunst, S.M.A.K. Gent, 2002

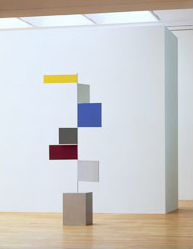
Jürgen Partenheimer, Kunstmuseum Bonn, Germany, 1998

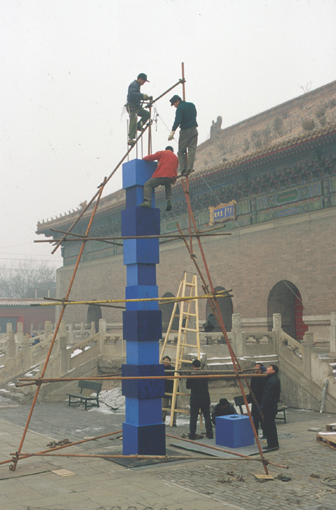
Jürgen Partenheimer, China National Museum of Fine Art, Beijing, "World Axis", Imperial Archives, Forbidden City, Beijing, 2000

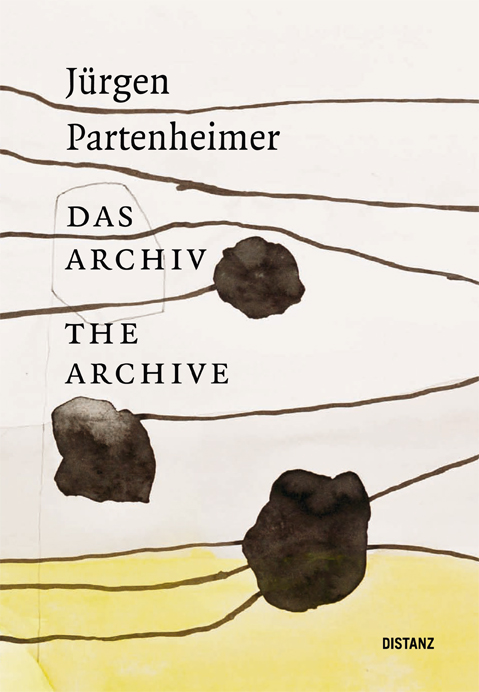
Jürgen Partenheimer. Das Archiv - The Archive, Distanz Publishers, Berlin, 2014

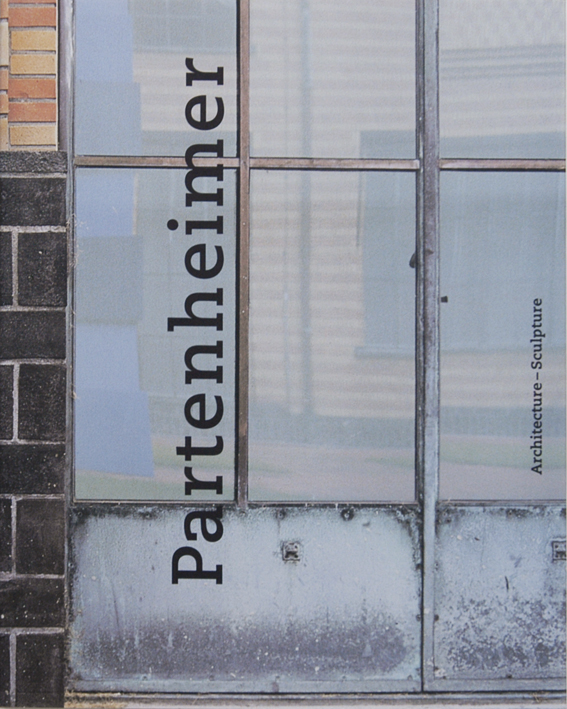
Jürgen Partenheimer. Architecture-Sculpture, Den Haag, 2000

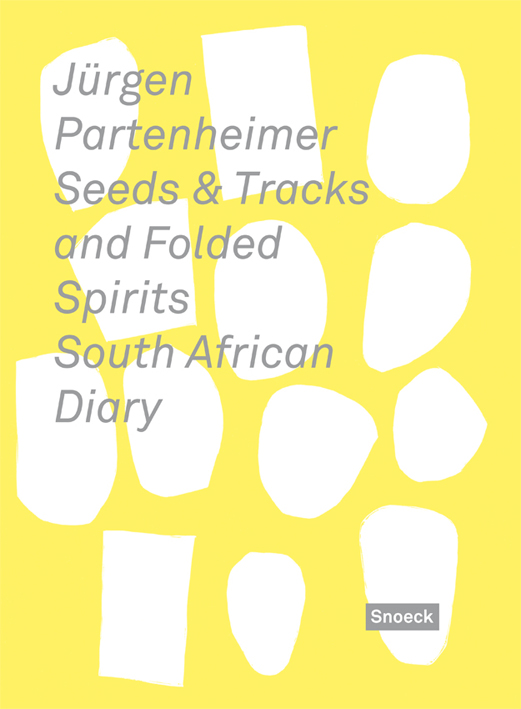
Jürgen Partenheimer. Folded Spirits. Snoeck, Köln, 2011

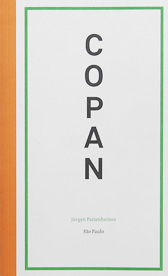
Jürgen Partenheimer, Copan - Diario Paulistano, 2006

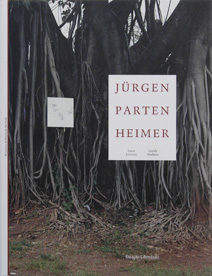
Jürgen Partenheimer. Suave Loucura, São Paulo. Editora Estação Liberdade, 2005

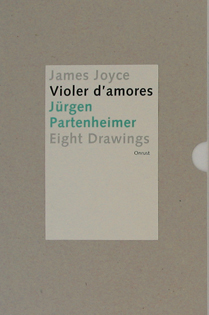
Jürgen Partenheimer, Violer d'amores, artist's book with drawings, collages and text excerpts from James Joyce' Finnegans Wake', 2004, Onrust, Amsterdam 2004

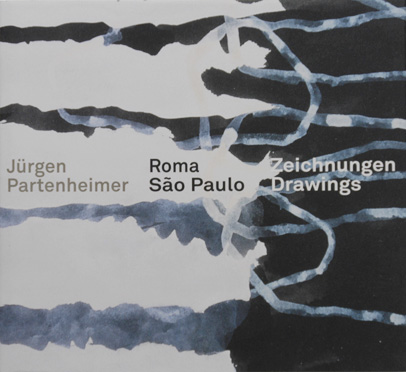
Jürgen Partenheimer. Roma - São Paulo', Karlsruhe. Richter Verlag, 2006
