= Harlequin (Picasso) =

Painting by Pablo Picasso

- Artist: Pablo Picasso
- Year: 1913
- Medium: Oil on canvas
- Dimensions: 88.5 cm × 46 cm (34.8 in × 18 in)
- Location: Kunstmuseum, The Hague

Harlequin is a painting of 1913 by the Spanish artist Pablo Picasso. It can loosely be considered a portrait of a harlequin, but through the lens of Picasso's cubist style, in which "Picasso paints a figure from several angles at once, dividing it into rectangles and circles". The painting is considered an example of "synthetic cubism", a development from Picasso's earlier "geometric cubism". Within "synthetic cubism" elements of collages were included and the image appeared slightly closer to reality than the abstractions of geometric cubism.

The painting hangs in the Kunstmuseum, The Hague, Netherlands.

== History in the Kunstmuseum ==
Harlequin was acquired by the Kunstmuseum in the 1950s. In the 1990s, the director Rudi Fuchs wished to sell the painting so that funds could be made available for improving the museum's collection in other areas. According to Fuchs, "The other two (Harlequin and Sibyl) are from much later and do not fit in with the rest of the collection." Other museum directors in the Netherlands were strongly opposed to the sale, and it never went through.
