= Hans Locher =

Swiss engineer and pioneer

- Born: 6 February 1920
- Died: 9 June 2009 (aged 89)
- Occupations: Engineer, business executive
- Known for: Electronic data capture, signal transmission and processing in textile industry
- Spouse: Alice Weisser

Hans Locher (6 February 1920 – 9 June 2009) was a Swiss engineer and business executive who pioneered electronic data capture and signal transmission and processing in the textile industry. He spent his career at Zellweger Uster, where he rose from development engineer to chairman of the group's executive board.

== Early life and education ==
Locher was born on 6 February 1920 in Heiden. He was the son of Johann Locher and Clara née Vogt. He was Protestant and from Heiden. After completing his studies, he obtained his diploma as a telecommunications technician from the Technicum of Winterthur in 1942.

== Career ==
Locher joined Zellweger Uster SA as a development engineer in 1946. He became technical director in 1964, and was appointed general director and chairman of the group's executive board in 1978. During his career, he was a pioneer in electronic data capture (electrotechnology), as well as in signal transmission and processing in the textile industry.

In 1950, Locher developed a yarn evenness tester. The electronic measurement method he developed made it possible to create automatic regulation mechanisms and yarn production monitoring systems.

== Recognition ==
In 1980, Locher received an honorary doctorate from the Swiss Federal Institute of Technology in Zurich.

== Personal life ==
Locher married Alice Weisser. He died on 9 June 2009.

== Bibliography ==
- Müller-Grieshaber, Peter (2026). "Locher, Hans". In Historical Dictionary of Switzerland. Translated by André Naon.
