= Kunstmuseum Den Haag =

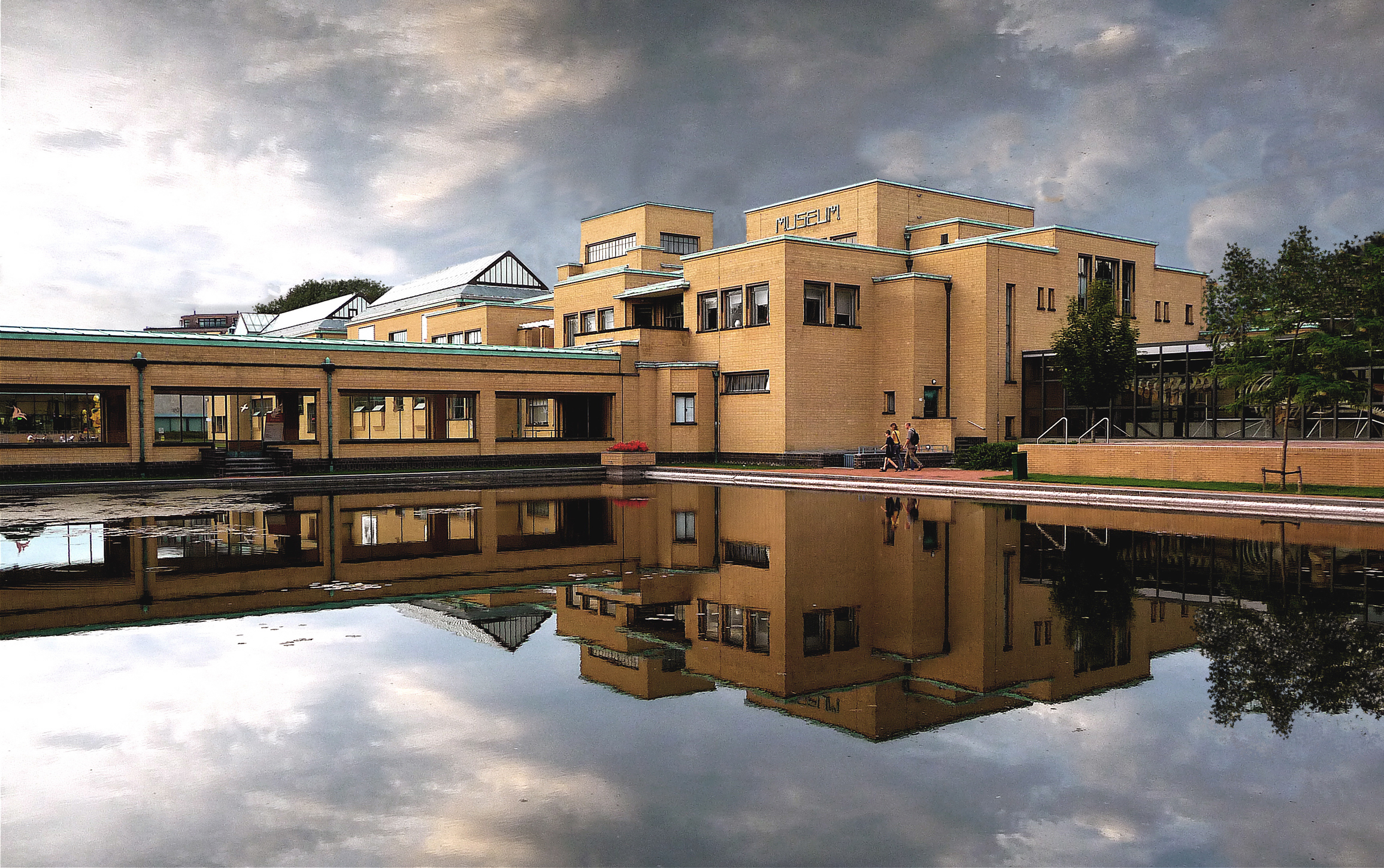
- Museum building designed by H.P. Berlage
- Interactive fullscreen map
- Former names: Museum voor Moderne Kunst, Gemeentemuseum
- Established: 29 May 1866; 160 years ago
- Location: Stadhouderslaan 41; The Hague, Netherlands
- Coordinates: 52°05′23″N 4°16′50″E
- Type: Art museum
- Visitors: 361,922 (2023): Ranking 9th nationally (2016)
- Director: Margriet Schavemaker (from 1 June 2024)
- Architect: Hendrik Petrus Berlage
- Website: www.kunstmuseum.nl

The Kunstmuseum Den Haag is an art museum in The Hague in the Netherlands, founded in 1866 as the Museum voor Moderne Kunst. Later, until 1998, it was known as Haags Gemeentemuseum, and until the end of September 2019 as Gemeentemuseum Den Haag. It has a collection of around 165,000 works, over many different forms of art. In particular, the Kunstmuseum is renowned for its large Mondrian collection, the largest in the world. Mondrian's last work, Victory Boogie-Woogie, is on display at the museum.

The current museum building was constructed between 1931 and 1935, designed by the Dutch architect H.P. Berlage.

The KM21 (museum for contemporary art) and Fotomuseum Den Haag (The Hague museum for photography) are part of the Kunstmuseum, though not housed in the same building and with a separate entrance fee.

The new director Margriet Schavemaker started on 1 June 2024. She replaces Benno Tempel, who left as of 1 November 2023.

== Collection ==
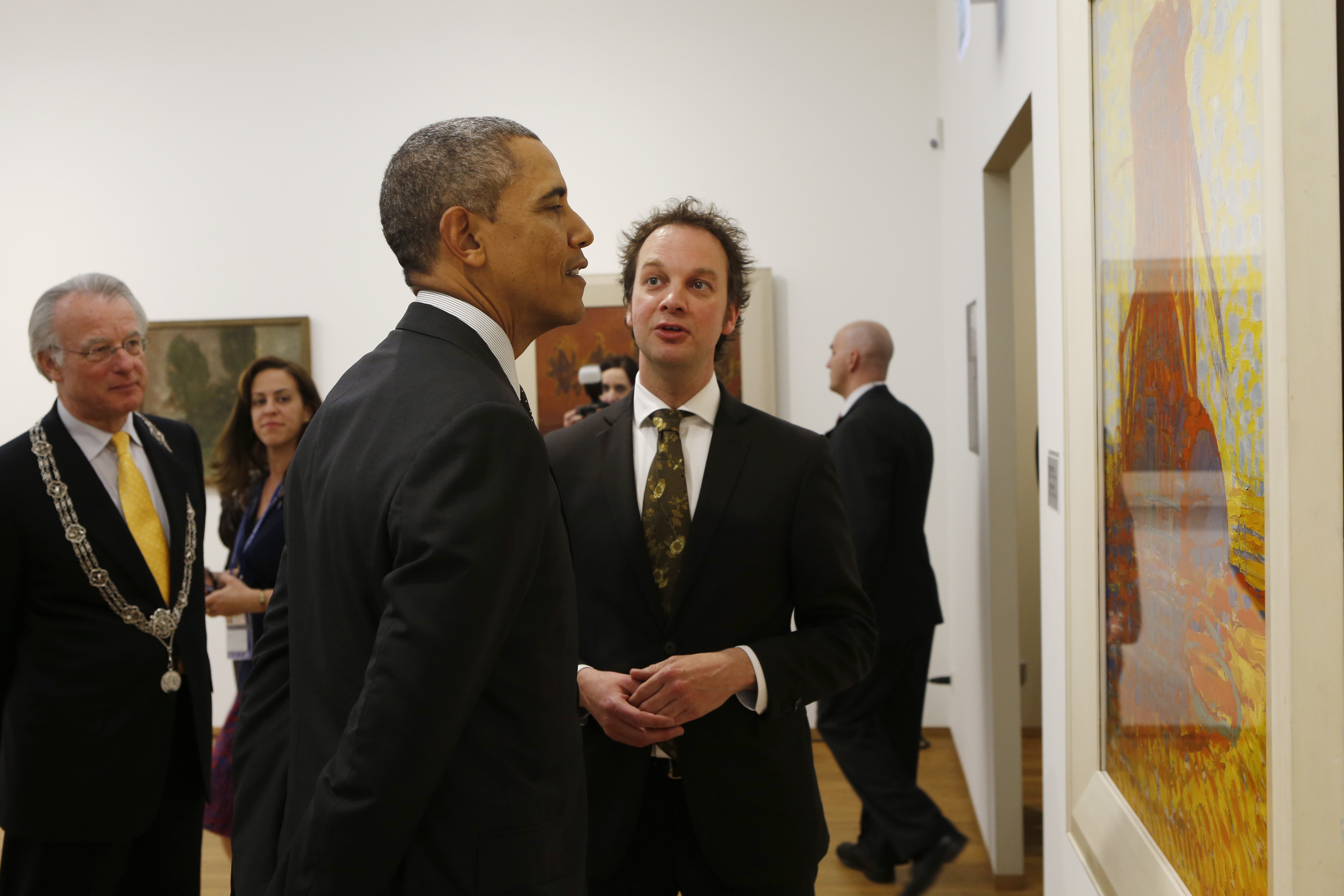
Barack Obama visiting the museum in 2014

=== Modern art ===
The museum's collection of modern art includes works by international artists (Edgar Degas, Claude Monet, Pablo Picasso, Egon Schiele, Frank Stella, Lee Bontecou, Henri Le Fauconnier and many others) and Dutch artists (Constant, Vincent van Gogh, Johan Jongkind, Pyke Koch, Piet Mondriaan, Charley Toorop, Jan Toorop, and many others).

=== Pottery and Glass art ===
The Kunstmuseum has one of the largest collections of Dutch Delftware in the world. Selected pieces of the collection are on display at the permanent gallery which represents Dutch art in the 'Golden Age'. The museum also holds one of the largest collections of Persian ceramics and glasses in Europe.

=== Print Room ===
The museum has a collection of 19th- and 20th-century prints, posters and drawings, containing around 50,000 items. It comprises works by Dutch artists such as Co Westerik and Jan Toorop, as well as works by Rodolphe Bresdin, Ingres, Paul Klee, Toulouse-Lautrec, Odilon Redon and others. A selection is on view in the print room.

=== Fashion ===
The collection of fashion items, accessories, jewellery, drawings and prints includes historical items as well as modern ones by designers such as Cristóbal Balenciaga, Gabrielle Chanel, André Courrèges, John Galliano and Fong Leng. For reasons of conservation items are only shown at temporary exhibitions.

=== Music ===
The music collection includes a large collection of musical instruments and a music library, with an emphasis on European music. The collection mainly includes fortepianos, wind and plucked string instruments. Also, there are instruments from other cultures and contemporary electronic instruments. In addition, the collection includes prints, posters, drawings and photographs relating to 'performance practice'. Part of the collection came from the Scheurleer Music History Museum, that lasted from 1905 to 1935, and was purchased after the bankruptcy of Scheurleer & Zoonen in 1932.

== Exhibitions ==
The museum has around 25 to 30 exhibitions per year. In 2021 and 2022 exhibitions have included Portuguese painter Paula Rego, Basque fashion designer Cristóbal Balenciaga and English potter and artist Grayson Perry. The 2021 exhibition Monet: The Garden Paintings was voted as the best museum exhibition in the Netherlands.

== Visitor numbers ==
These numbers are solely for the Kunstmuseum, excluding KM21 and the Fotomuseum

Year	Number	Notes
2024	385,740	
2023	361,922	
2022	274,530	
2021	87,412	Closed for 169 days, open for 196 days (with restrictions)
2020	201,000	The museum was closed 112 days due to coronavirus measures
2019	416,204	
2018	302,141	

== Berlage Building ==
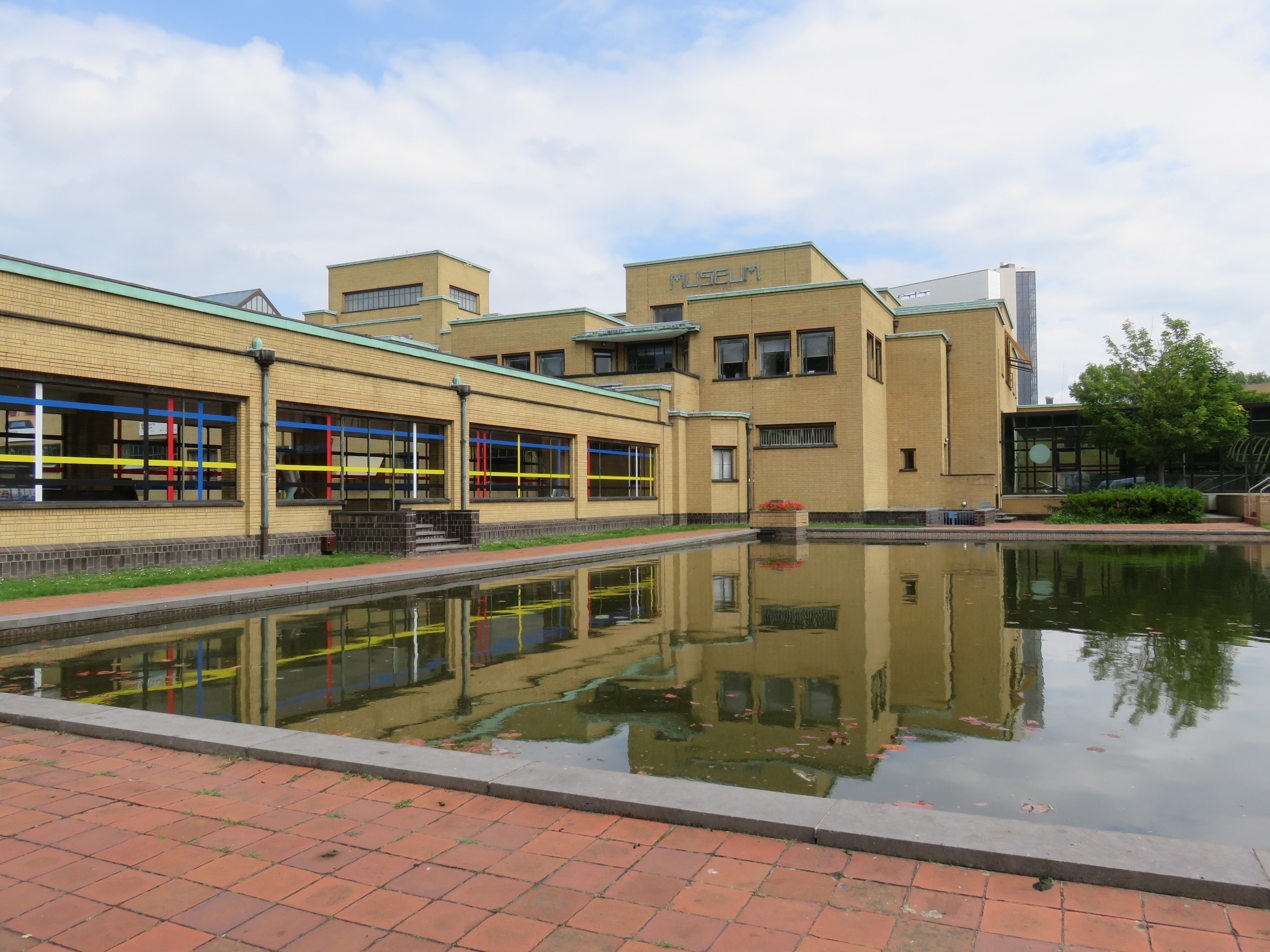
The entrance hall, flanked by ponds on both sides, leads to the main building

The current home of the Kunstmuseum is a purpose-built museum designed by the Dutch architect, H.P. Berlage. Although Berlage died just before its completion (with his son-in-law Emil Emanuel Strasser overseeing the building's final touches), it stayed faithful to Berlage's distinctive, inventive vision. It has been called "the dream museum", with a "completely separate goal ... than to museums of the time in the Netherlands." The final result was "not a pompous temple of art ... but a [museum of] simple, sober and accessible appearance; not imposing but inviting."

Nevertheless, this sober and accessible appearance was not to the liking of all early critics, more familiar with museums in the grand classical style. The use of everyday bricks rather than more opulent stones such as marble and granite was criticised. It lacked majesty. Others compared the building to a factory or a swimming pool, especially because of the two high towers at the back of the building complex. The inside of the building was immediately praised, however. The impressive entrance hall, with coloured tiles, columns and hall was particularly well received. This dual consideration was so summarised by one newspaper: "There is little to admire on the outside of Berlage's final creation, but on the inside there are many attractive features, and in general the whole complex of rooms creates the pleasant, calming and intimate feel.

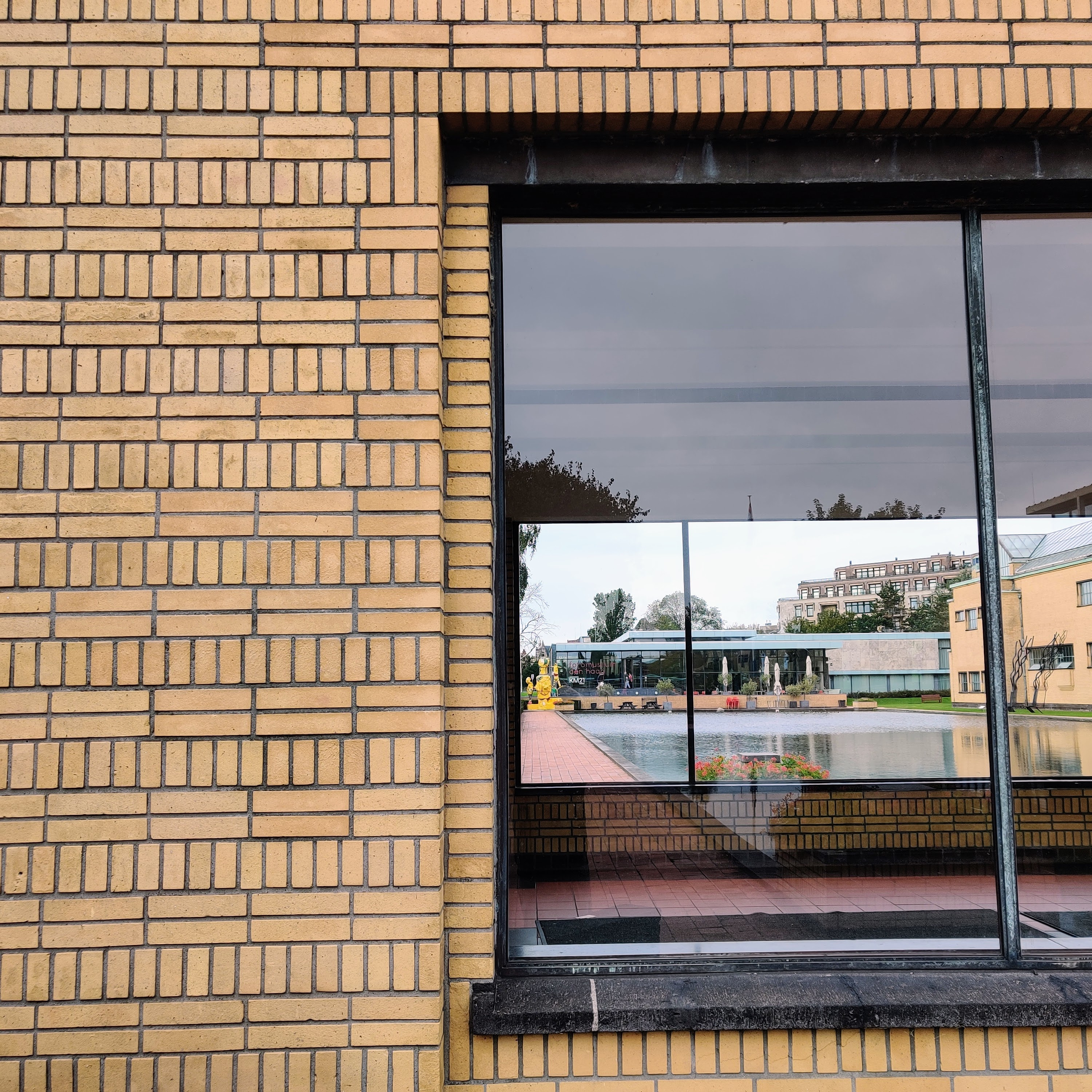
Original brickwork of Kunstmuseum. It shows the decorative design introduced by the architect, HP Berlage

Although the building appears constructed from distinctive yellow bricks, Berlage was enthusiastic about the possibilities of modern materials, such as reinforced concrete. As photographs taken during the construction indicate, the structural parts of the museum were built from iron and concrete. Only when this was finished were the bricks added as decorative elements around the concrete framework. To emphasise the decorative nature of the bricks, Berlage stipulated that each layer of bricks must be perpendicular to the level below it (and therefore be much weaker than the usual parallel layering of bricks).

Another unique aspect of Berlage's design was the central role played by the number 11. Many of the architectural elements are determined by the number 11, or multiples thereof. Most of the 4 million yellow bricks used in the building have a dimension of 5.5 cm × 22 cm × 11 cm. The width of windows panes in 44 cm.

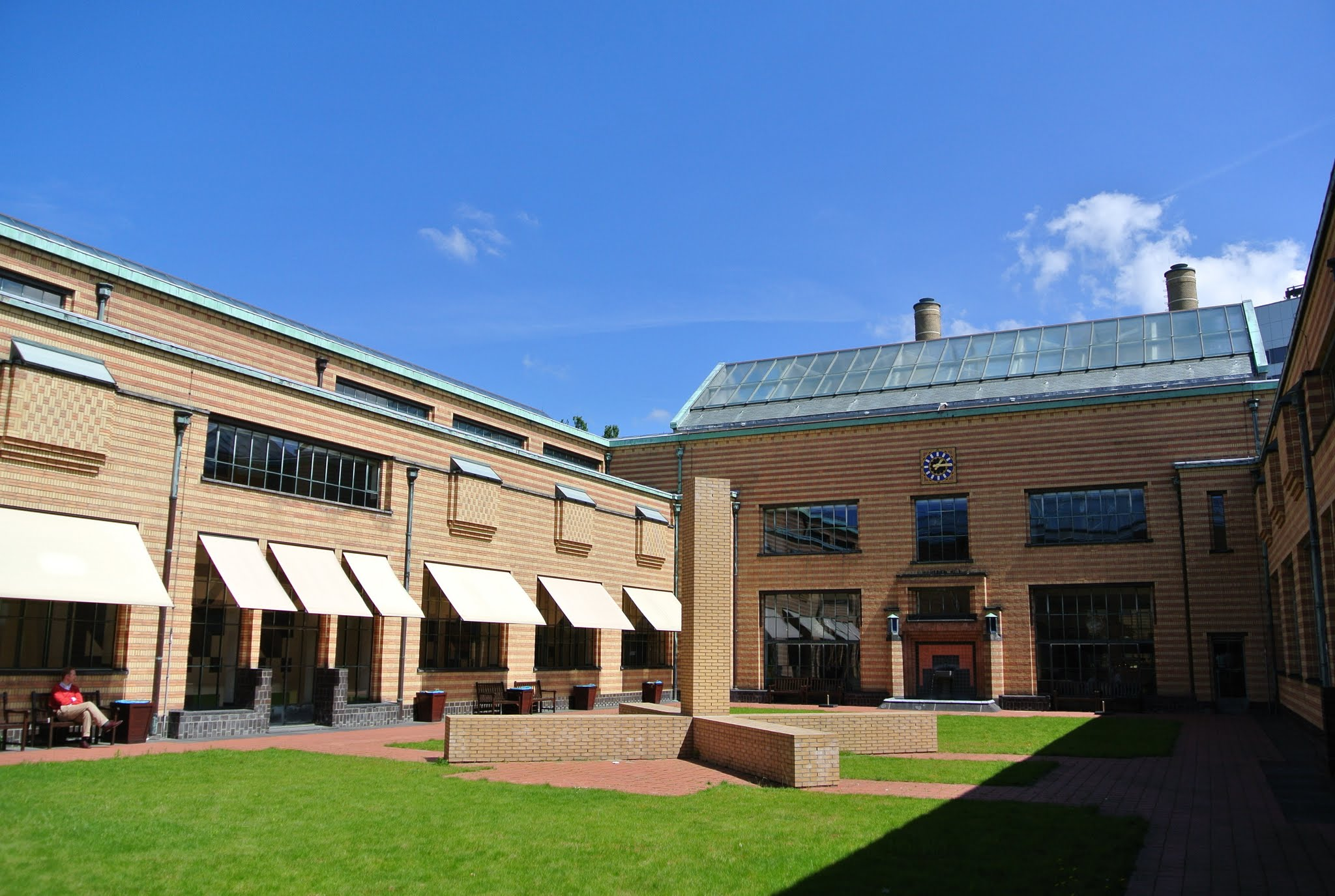
The inner garden was covered during renovations and is now a cafe and rest area

The then director of the museum, Hendrik Enno van Gelder, worked closely with Berlage on the design. One point of contention was the light source in the galleries. After much experimentation and argument, Berlage settled on a novel design. Unlike most museums, which had artificial lighting in the ceiling, the museum would make use of natural daylight, with blinds in the skylights above regulating the intensity of the light. "Light, light, Berlage has captured the magic of light here", one journalist marvelled. Newspapers also reported "all kinds of ingenious installations" as part of the modern design of the building – the warming, the ventilation and the lighting on the facade were all innovations for museums of the time.

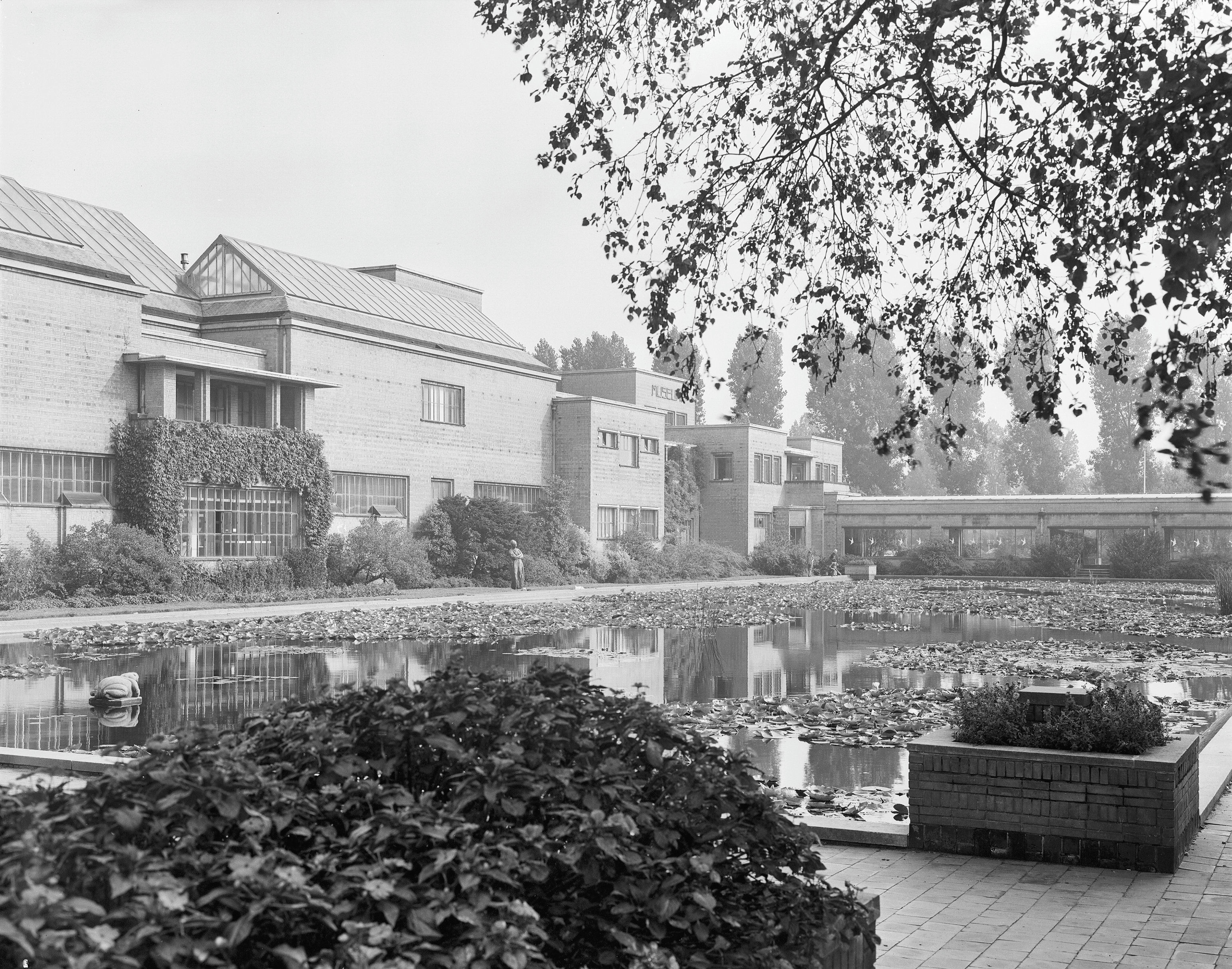
For much of the twentieth century, the museum's brickwork and water were covered with plants. as indicated from this photo from 1976

== Founding history ==
=== 1866–1912 ===
On 29 May 1866, a group of artists and collectors in The Hague established The Society for the Development of a Museum of Modern Art (Dutch: Vereeniging tot het oprigten van een Museum van Moderne Kunst). The artworks brought together by this group would form the original core of the Kunstmuseum.

Among the initiators were The Hague politician Hugo Ferdinand (otherwise known Baron van Zuylen van Nijevelt), the Director of the Mauritshuis, Jean Zacharie Mazel, the artists David Bles, Louwrens Hanedoes, Carel Vosmaer, the architect Henri Camp, the former minister Agnites Vrolik, and Hendrik Steengracht van Oosterland, a representative of King William III. Later directors of the association included the artists Philip Sadée, Hendrik Willem Mesdag, Jacob Maris, Salomon Verveer and Johannes Stroebel. The association also had many artists and notables among its members, including Princes Frederik and Alexander of the Netherlands. The association started by purchasing paintings and was soon looking for exhibition space. The St Sebastian building and Panorama Mesdag, among others, were used temporarily as accommodation.

By 1871, the council had taken the decision to start a gemeentemuseum (council museum), including both historical artworks and objects, and contemporary pieces of art donated by The Society. The historical objects would be managed by the council, and the contemporary art by the Society. The museum was to be on the street called the Korte Beestenmarkt, in the centre of The Hague. Within a few months, it had been visited by Queen Wilhelmina. It included paintings such as Jan van Goyen's View of The Hague from the South East, now in the Haags Historisch Museum.

The museum collection continued to grow through the later parts of the nineteenth century, outgrowing the space at Korte Beestenmarkt. In 1883, the curators asked the council for funds for the refurbishment of the St Sebastian building in Korte Vijverberg, a short distance from the original setting for the museum. The new location was opened in July 1884. Space continued to be a problem, however, and temporary exhibitions continued to be shown at other locations in The Hague.

=== 1912–1935 ===
1912 saw the appointment of Hendrik van Gelder, who was already the official archivist for The Hague, as director of the Gemeentemuseum. His leadership would prove vital to the museum's dramatic evolution. Renewing the building was his primary concern. Extensive investigation from a couple of years before had confirmed that the St Sebastian building was completely unsuited to the collection – the building was vulnerable to fire, the quality of light poor, the rooms too small. Additionally, the original merging of two collections (of older, and contemporary art) confused the purpose and presentation of the museum.

Within a couple years of his appointment, van Gelder presented ideas to mayor and council of The Hague for a new building for modern art. It was envisaged as being part of a huge complex of cultural institutions, with no less than five separate museums. The First World War delayed any formal decision, but by 1918, the city council not only decided to approve van Gelder's ideas, but establish a Department for Art and Science (in Dutch: Dienst voor Kunsten en Wetenschappen) to give continued government support.

The renowned Dutch architect Hendrik Petrus Berlage was appointed in 1919. He worked with van Gelder to devise this new cultural complex for The Hague, based on a site on the Stadshouderlaan, a little to the north west of the city centre. A first project idea was exhibited at a renowned art studio in The Hague, the Pulchri Studio, and was popular with the general public. It formed a U-shape, with two wings – one wing a museum for modern art, and the other one for applied arts. There was also a concert building, and space for other cultural activities. However, The Hague council found the plans too expensive and too ambitious. Nevertheless, some of the ideas – such as the reflective pond, and the notion of a complex of buildings – would remain in the ultimate design. Berlage's more modest design of 1922 were also rejected, and the council cooled on the overall idea of a set of buildings with multiple cultural purposes.

Frustrated at the lack of action, the director Van Gelder threatened to resign. Things now started moving. A firmer set of requirements was created. There was clarity concerning the collection development of the museum. The Gemeentemuseum would be a museum for art from 1800 onwards; earlier art would to be exhibited at the Mauritshuis. The cost of the new building would be around 2.5m guilders, and it would cover a space of maximum 5,000 m^{2}.

Within 2 years Berlage had produced designs that would result in the current building. Work started in 1931, but it would turn out to be Berlage's last design. The architect died in 1934. The work was faithfully completed under the direction of Berlage's son-in-law, E.E. Strasser. It was officially opened on 29 May 1935.

=== 1935–1945 ===
The museum soon began receiving international attention. It received loans of paintings by artists such as Van Gogh, Manet and Monet, and organising varied exhibitions, such as one on contemporary French art, and another on oriental influences on French art. Shortly after opening, an international congress of museum workers gathered in The Hague, celebrating the "clear and honest" appearance of the museum. A year later an international conference on women's rights was hosted at the Gemeentemuseum. The main speaker, Margery Corbett Ashby, spoke of her "admiration for the building, which represented the modern life of a great city". The museum was noted for its progressive attitude to women's art: the original layout included a room dedicated to female artists (such as Coba Ritsema and Ina Hooft), an unusual decision at the time.

The advent of the Second World War had an immediate effect. At the outbreak of war in mid-1939, the director Hendrik van Gelder rapidly made plans to keep the collections safe. Unlike the Rijksmuseum and Mauritshuis (which had shut immediately), the Gemeentemuseum would continue to show its artworks and allow public entry. Van Gelder had the advantage of a new storage area under the museum – Berlage's concrete framework offered reliable protection. In the advent of any physical threat the works could quickly be moved there. When the Netherlands was attacked the next year (10 May 1940), the museum staff worked quickly to bring the artworks into safety. Paintings were taken out of their frames, and with the help of volunteers such as the Boy Scouts, brought to the museum depot. The German invasion happened in a few days; the Dutch surrender and cessation of fighting meant that the artworks could quickly be reinstalled, with the paintings replaced in their frames. The museum reopened in late May 1940.

Museum life continued seemingly as normal immediately after the German occupation. Concerts continued to be given. Exhibitions such as "Still Lifes and Flowers from 30 Contemporary Painters" and one dedicated to the Dutch artist Frans Helfferich were shown. The latter was introduced by the new director, Gerhardus Knuttel, who took over in 1941. But as the war continued, things became significantly more difficult. In 1942, the museum was earmarked by the Nazi occupiers to be destroyed as part of the creation of a defensive line in the city. Only after heavy protests from museum staff were the plans altered. However, it was no longer safe to keep the collection in the underground depot. Within a hurried period of 14 days, the entire collection was transported to various bunkers throughout the Netherlands. Following that, the Germans used the empty museum for storage. The year after it was reported that Knuttel had taken honourable resignation from his position; in reality he was forced into a prisoner of war camp for refusing to work with the Nazis.

At the end of the war ended there was considerable damage to the building. V2 rockets had destroyed the roofs and glass had been blown out the windows. There was considerable flooding, and doors and flooring had either been taken away or become unusable. Work immediately began on the repair so that the museum could come back to life.

=== Post-war ===
Soon after the war, the Gemeentemuseum appointed its first female director, Victoria Hefting – one of the first women to assume such a position in the Netherlands. She was determined to put the collection to good use: in a speech of 1948 she adopted the words of the French poet Lafontaine "l'usage seulement fait la possession" – "Possession is only justified by usage."

Perhaps most striking under her leadership, the Gemeentemuseum extended its international ambitions, an important point of connection after the divisions of the Second World War. Her staff organised exhibitions on the Dutch proto-impressionist Johan Barthold Jongkind that received positive reviews for illuminating French - Dutch connections in the development of 19th-century art, on Danish sculpture and architecture, the Belgian artist James Ensor, Norwegian art, and even the German poet and writer Goethe. Hefting also started moves to establish a Dutch Fashion Museum.

Hefting was also responsible for the creation of the Dijsselhof Room, an authentic creation of the architecture and interior design of the room of a nineteenth-century artist. In the museum's ongoing acknowledgement of the place of women art, Hefting especially commissioned needleworkers to recreate the hanging designs in the room. The room still exists now.

Unfortunately, her time as director was short. Hefting remarried in 1950 and was obliged to resign. it was legally not permitted for married women to work in government services, a law that would not be repealed until 1957.

=== 1950s ===
The international perspective that characterised Heffing's time as director was continued by her successor, Louis Wijsenbeek. The 1950s would see exhibitions related to, amongst others, Cézanne, Van Gogh, US modern art, Max Beckmann, Italian jewellery, Rembrandt, Futurism, Japanese art, Oskar Kokoschka and pre-Columbian art. Wijsenbeek had initially stated said he wanted to reduce the number of collections. However, the width and number exhibitions belied that.

Wijsenbeek was also conscious of the more open nature of the museum ("The museum was initially an institution, intended exclusively for the curator and his friends. However, the idea gradually developed that a museum is community property") And the 1950s also saw the museum tackling the variety of types of art held within its walls. The Dutch Fashion Museum opened in 1952. It was located in the nearby Museum Bredius, but under the directorship of Wijsenbeek. And in 1954, the Film Museum opened, situated in the Gemeentemuseum itself. The World Press Photo exhibition was also held in the museum. And in a more tricky moment, disputes over the purpose of the music collection led the resignation of the curator.

Picasso's Woman with Mustard Pot was purchased by the Gemeentemuseum in 1956.

The museum was beginning to forge its identity as the spiritual home of Piet Mondrian. The collector Sal Slijper had donated Mondrian artworks in 1951. Four years later a large-scale Mondrian exhibition was organised: the first to ever give a wide review of the artist's work from his early nature pieces and his development towards abstraction. Equally significant was the purchase of three Picasso paintings, Woman with Mustard Pot, Harlequin and Sibylle.

=== 1960s ===
The conveyor belt of exhibitions continued. This also prompted the most significant architectural change to the museum since the opening of Berlage's building. In 1961, the council of The Hague agreed to spend 750,000 guilders to add a new wing to the museum. It was to be designed by a pair of architects, S.J. Schamhart and J.F.Heyligers. The director Louis Wijsenbeek, now in his tenth year in the role, was clear about the purpose of the space: "the permanent collection can finally become permanent." For too long, in Wijsenbeek's opinion, the fixed collection of the museum had been moved about to make space for temporary exhibitions. Indeed, Wijsenbeek had been pushing for such an extension since the start of his tenure at the museum in the 1950s.

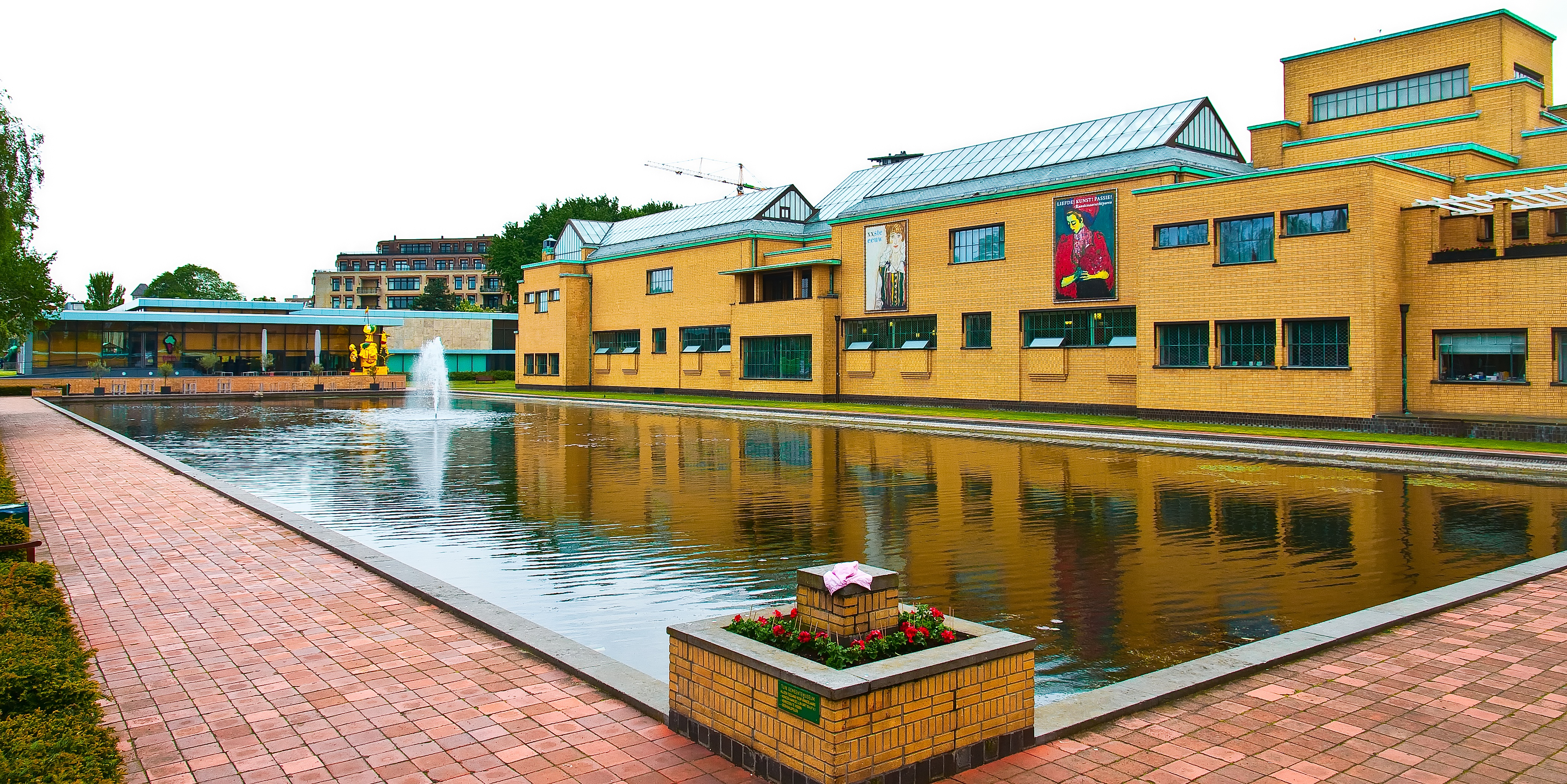
The Schamhart wing (on left, behind the pond) was opened in 1962

The wing took a year to build and was opened in July 1962. Its sober modern design was a deliberate contrast to the Berlage building. The original museum "is the work of a great architect … and we are leaving it alone," said Schamhart and Heyligers. Named the Schamhart Wing, it featured many novelties both in its usage (for instance, a children's workshop area) and in the design (huge walls of glass, split floors and moveable walls). The moveable walls were an indication that Wijsenbeek's original plan to host the permanent collection had changed. The new wing was an adaptable space that could be adjusted to suite different temporary exhibition designs.

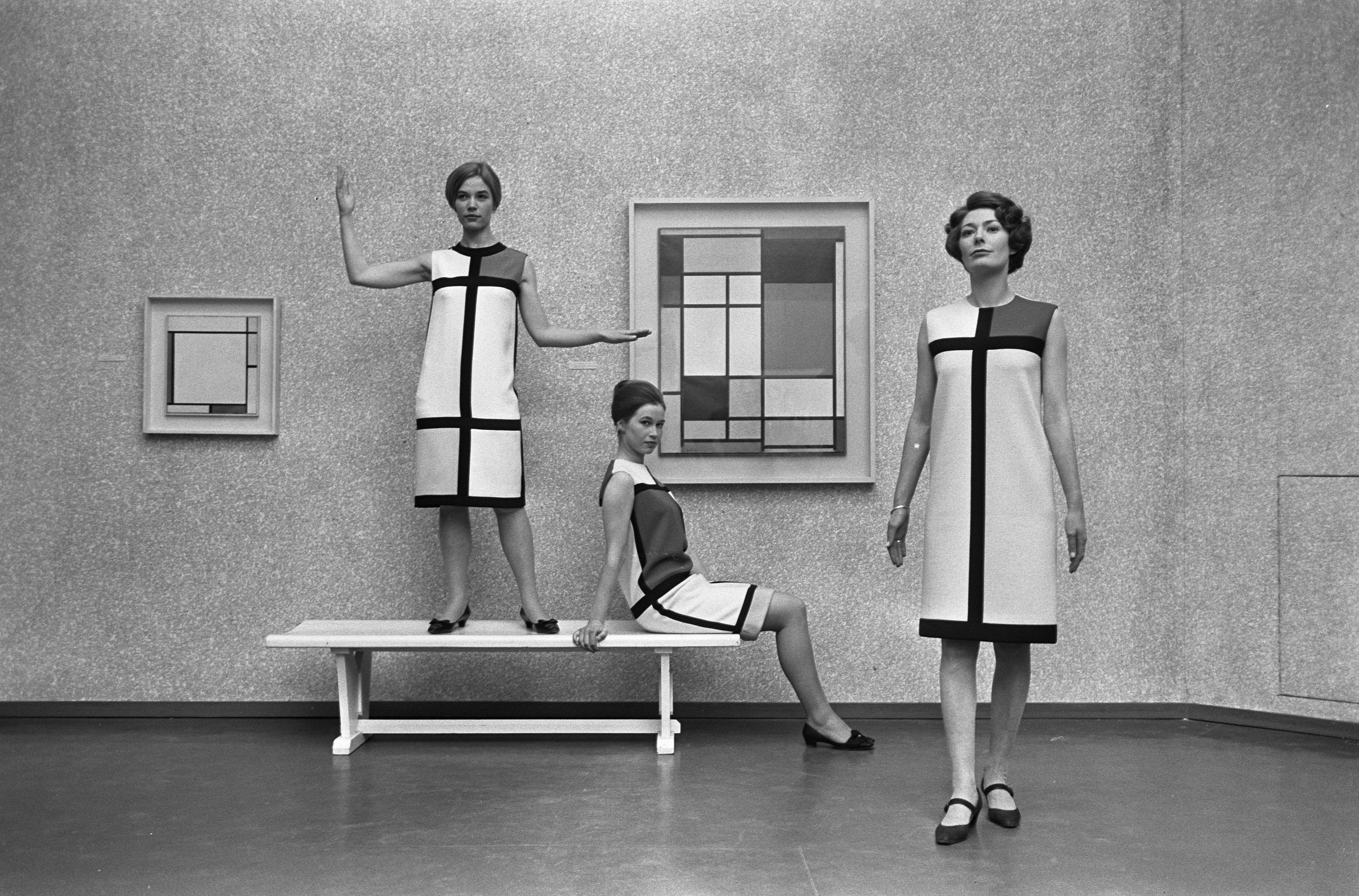
Yves St Lauren dresses inspired by Mondrian and exhibited at the Gemeentemuseum, January 1966

The flow of exhibitions continued - including the iconic presentation of Mondrian-inspired dresses designed by Yves St Laurent - but other problems beset the museum. There were thefts of Chinese porcelain, and also of a valuable violin. There was a clash with the Stedelijk Museum in Amsterdam: both museums scheduled exhibitions of contemporary American art at the same time. And there was also a dispute with local artists and the American minimalist Carl Andre. Most seriously, a number of younger curators left the museum, ostensibly because of their difficulty in expanding the museum to deal with contemporary art.

Other innovations included the first exhibition for blind or hard of seeing visitors - 22 sculptures that they had permission to touch.

=== 1970s ===
The start of 1970 was marked by clashes with the Beroepsvereniging van Beeldende Kunstenaars (BBK), the Union of Visual Artists. A national organisation with local branches, members from The Hague called for more attention from the Gemeentemuseum. In particular the union demanded that they should be given an annual exhibition, and that two thirds of the museum purchasing budget should be for local artists. The museum was adamant this was not its job to do this - director Wijzenbeek suggested the creation of a separate Kunsthalle in The Hague with a focus only on exhibitions.

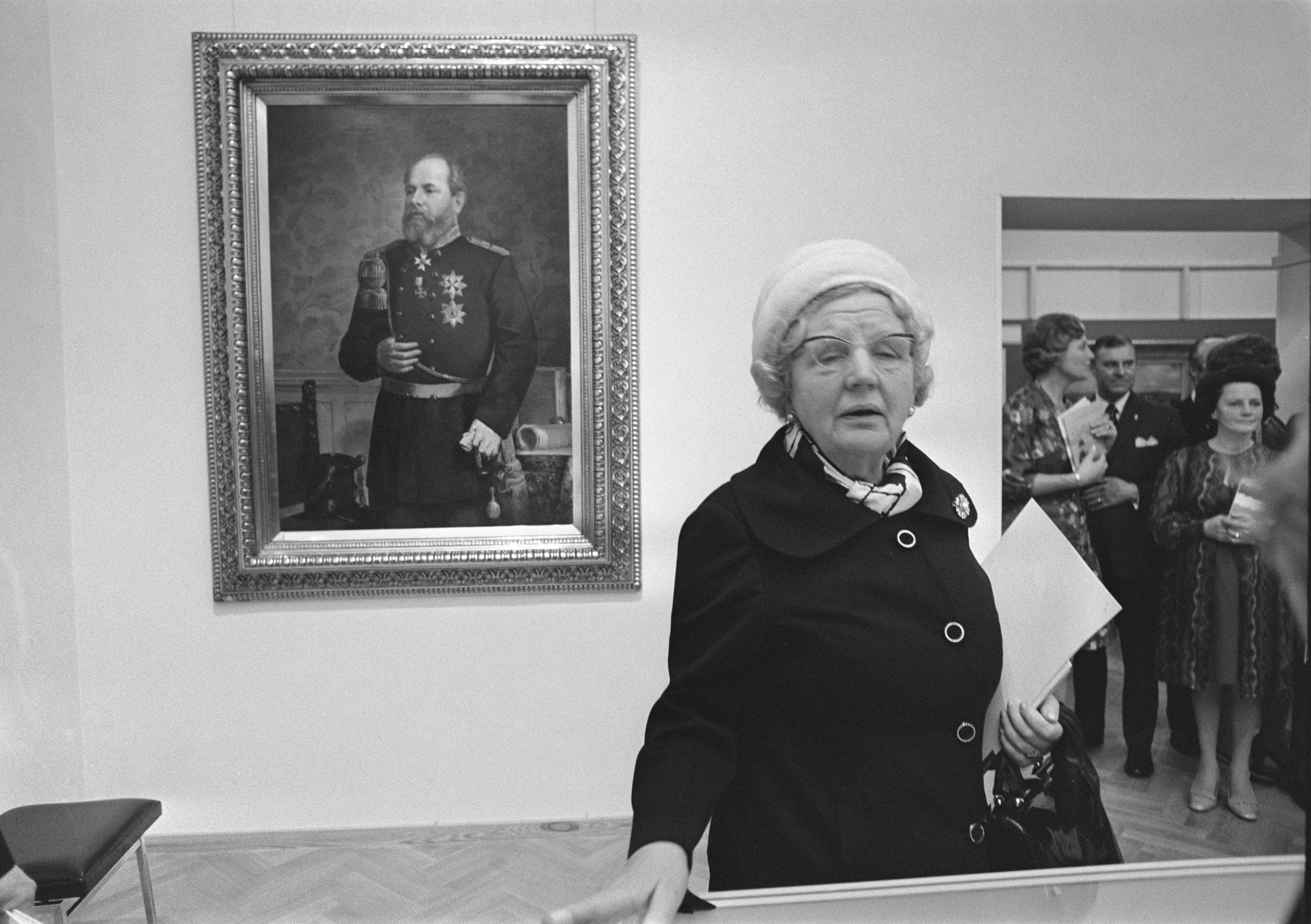
Queen Juliana visiting the 1974 exhibition Luxemburg onder Oranje-Nassau 1815-18

The argument continued to fester. In the summer of 1970, the BBK complained about the upcoming exhibition Contrasten in 25 jaren van Nederlandse Kunst (Contrasts in 25 years of Dutch Art). With a focus on a very limited number of Dutch artists, the BBK called it "a prime example of the hobbyism of museum bureaucrats". They threatened to 'kidnap some artworks or damage some Mondrian paintings." During the opening in September, they demonstrated outside the building. But it was less than expected: "a few stinkbombs and some exaggerated chatter," according to one journalist. The disenchantment would continue but the museum held firm, refusing the union's demands.

1971 proved to be a significant year. The collector Sal Slijpers left his entire collection to the Gemeentemuseum, comprising 190 Mondrians and 12 works by other artists. The legacy cemented the museum's place as the home for Mondrian's work. The collection was now of such depth that it could demonstrate the nearly all of the artist's development, with the exception of Mondrian's very last years in New York. The acquisition the year before of a significant set of works and documentation of the graphic designer Piet Zwart revealed a larger ambition: "a study centre, not only for Mondrian's work, but for the entire period between 1914 and 1940."

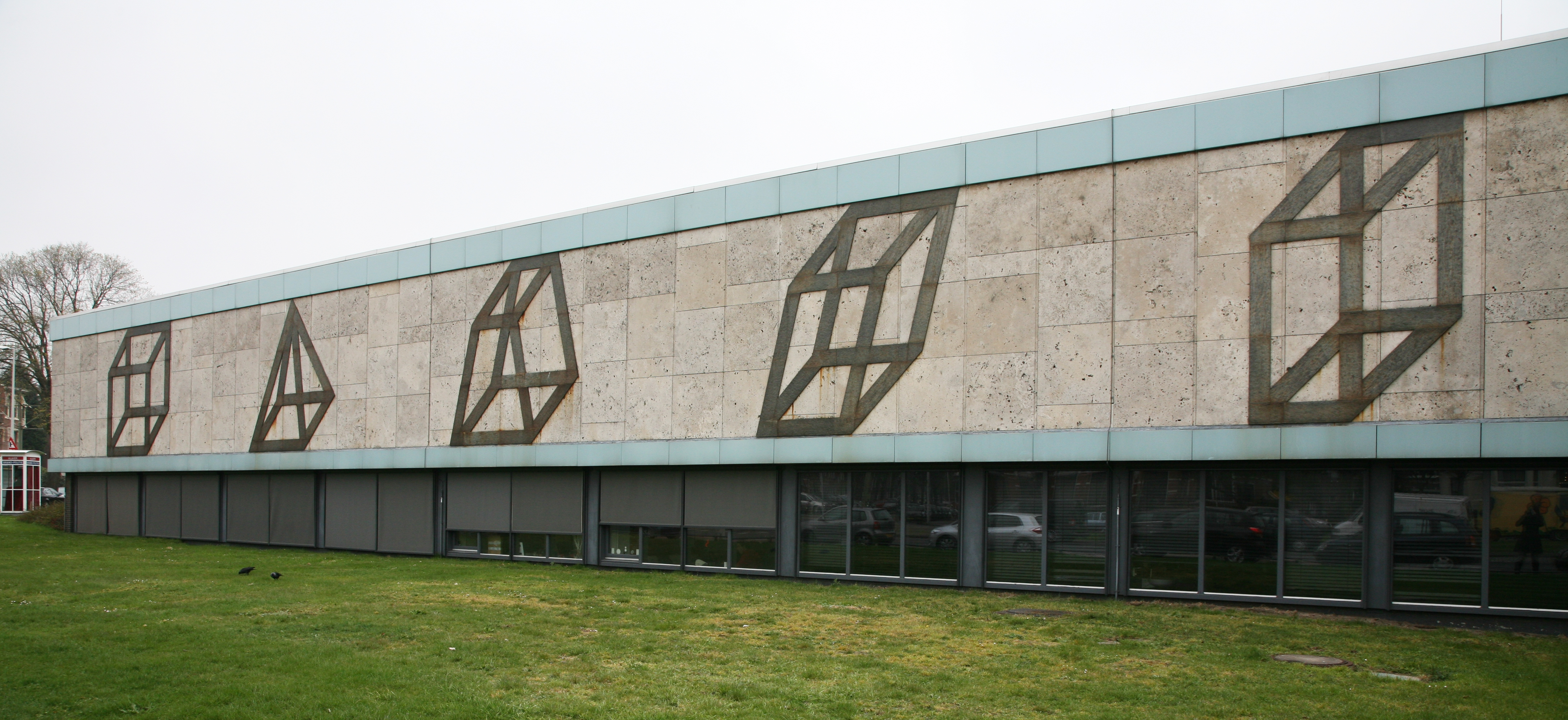
Relief with geometric figures, Sol LeWitt

Tension between the permanent collection and temporary exhibitions continued. At the start of the decade Wijzenbeek wrote that "in the future we will strive for a yearly programme with fewer temporary exhibitions". Yet their popularity grew. Huis in Huis Uit 1770 - 1970 (Inside and Outside the House, 1770 to 1970) drew together the expertise of all parts of the museum to exhibit two centuries of Dutch domestic and social history. Pompeii uit de as herrezen (Pompeii reborn from the ashes), showing objects related to the famous volcano explosion, became the museum's most successful exhibition: its circa 227,000 visitors far outstripping the number of visitors to the permanent collections. The early 1970s also saw exhibitions dedicated to Constantin Brancusi, and Sol LeWitt whose work would also adorn the wall of the Schamhart Wing.

Despite the addition of the Schamhart wing in the 1960s, space remained a problem. The acquisition budget of 600,000 guilders meant that there were regular additions to the collection - although some departments were growing much more rapidly than others. The curator of The Hague historical collection noted sadly in 1974 that they only made a handful of acquisitions per year, and despite being a founding part of the original Gemeentemuseum were now by far its smallest department. Demand for space was particularly keenly felt at the fashion department. This proved to be a strong argument. The council were persuaded to allow the building at Lange Vijvenberg 15 to become the permanent home for the fashion collection.

With the move of the National Library of the Netherlands to a purpose-built building near the main train station, other government-owned buildings in The Hague were becoming available. The Gemeentemuseum started talks with the council about using the Boterweg on the Grote Markt, and St Sebastian Doelen building (where the museum had been housed in the 19th century). A possible relationship to Museum voor Onderwijs was also considered, with Wijzenbeek a firm supporter of unifying the two museums. Such discussions would eventually lead to the new Museon building in the 1980s. The music department was still a core part of the museum, 1970 would see 26 instruments added to its collection, first part of a comprehensive catalogue printed, and regular concerts and lectures on music.

The connection with the city of The Hague was strengthened in other manners. An 'artcar' (kunstcar) was a travelling exhibition round the city. Other temporary exhibitions were installed around different venues around the city. The museum, conscious that it was not situated in the centre of the city, developed other connections throughout the city. Public programming encouraged trips from local educational institutions, the lending of works to schools and hospitals, portrait photography competitions for the public, contact with retirement homes, as well as the ongoing film programme.

=== 1980s ===
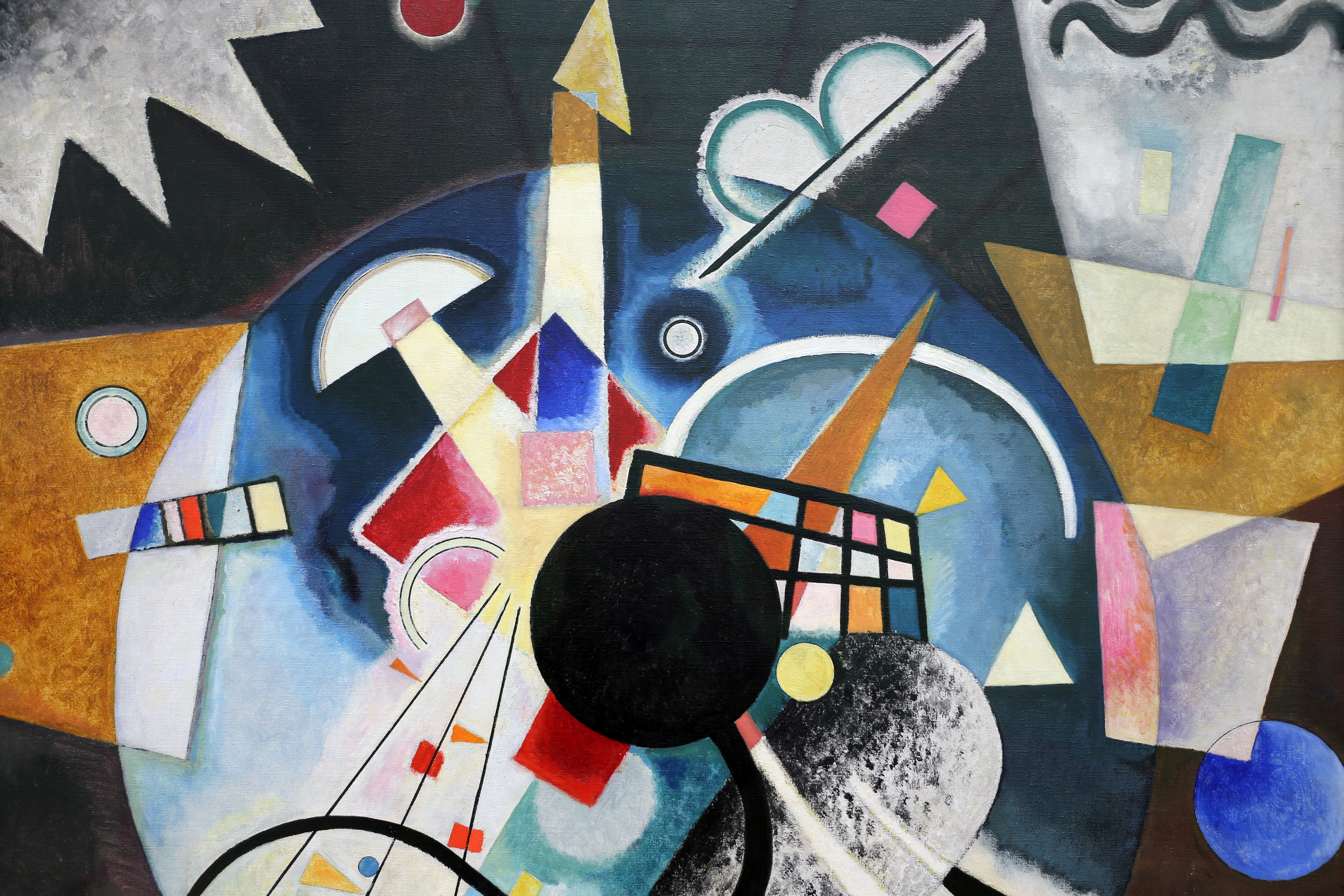
Wassily Kandinsky, A Centre, 1924. By the 1980s the museum could run large-scale exhibitions on early 20th-century abstract art, such as The Spiritual in Art

The 1980s saw significant changes in the identity of the Gemeentemuseum. The steady flow of international exhibitions focussed on the fine arts continued - a showing related to The Hague School of painters (De Haagsche School) attracted over a quarter of million visitors. However, director Theo van Velzen acknowledged that the museum had an elitist character. It relied too much on a traditional viewpoint of presenting art history. More needed to do done to engage the public. The 1980s would therefore see new types of exhibition; a reshuffling of the width and nature of its collections; and more interaction with other museums in The Hague.

Such changes were partly influenced by new thinking about the role of museums, but financial pressures were also playing a role. Interaction with the council - by far and away the majority funder of the museum - was problematic in the 1980s. Troubling cuts were announced in 1983, provoking a dramatic response; staff went as far to blockade access to the museum in the summer of 1984. The strong reaction was partially successful - the cuts were modified and spread more thinly over a broader range of institutions in the city - but the issue of finance would continue to for the rest of the decade and beyond.

In terms of the collection, one area of notable change was in the applied arts and design. The Gemeentemuseum had always had collections holdings in this area, but the level of ambition was raised. In 1985, a request for sponsors for a new design department was issued. The request was not well received by other Dutch museums, who felt the Gemeentemuseum was overstepping its role. But the appeal was successful, and by 1987, a permanent display of kitchens, telephones, chairs, hairdryers and other striking examples of twentieth century designed.

The incorporation of the fashion collection was the other dramatic addition to the scope of the museum. The council's budget cuts had forced the closure of The Hague Costume Museum in 1983. It was agreed that the collection would be displayed as part of the Gemeentemuseum. Within two years, a whole new approach to its display was established: curators contrasted historical and contemporary dress, a direct break with more chronological approaches.

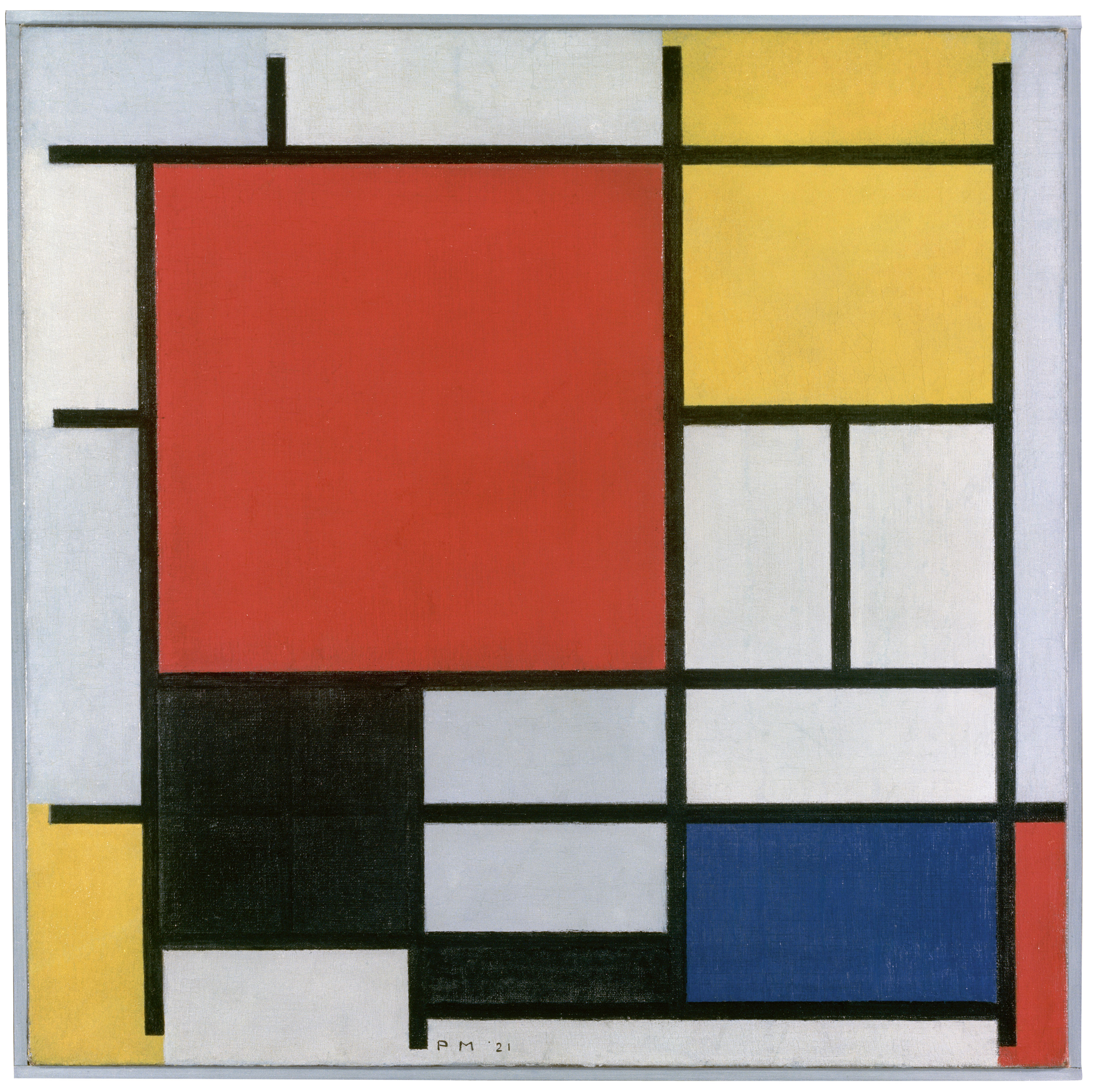
Piet Mondriaan, 1921 - Composition in Red, Yellow, Blue and Black. The extent to which Mondrian was identified with the museum has always been debated. The 1988 exhibition Mondrian, From Figurative to Abstract is one of many Gemeentemuseum exhibitions on the Dutch artist.

As fashion and the applied arts grew, so the artworks and objects related to the history of The Hague - part of the original bequest to the museum in the nineteenth century - continued to fall in importance. The city council eventually agreed house the collection in a new museum (in the St Sebastian building in Korte Vijverberg, where the Gemeentemuseum had once been housed). Also of note was the opening of Mondriaan House (now known as the Mondriaan Villa) in Winterswijk in the east of the Netherlands. The artworks shown in the house, where Mondrian spent much of his youth, largely consisted of artworks drawn from the Mondriaan collection of the Gemeentemuseum.

Perhaps the most challenging issue in the 1980s was the construction of the Museum voor Onderwijs (later known as Museon) next to the Gemeentemuseum. Designed by noted Dutch architect Wim Quist, the Museon was attached to the original Berlage construction. Though a separate museum, there were some shared spaces. Opened in 1985, there were immediate benefits for the GM. Nevertheless, this literal connection provoked confusion over the relationship. Were these really two separate museums? How should they work with each other? The directors of the two museums were hesitant but the council wanted to see more collaboration.

There were many successful exhibitions in the 1980s, demonstrating the museum's continuing ability to attract existing and new audiences. The Spiritual in Art provided a specific perspective on abstract art; Massacultuur showed consumer goods. More familiar themes continued to be addressed; De Haagsche School attracted over a quarter of million visitors following successful stints in Paris and London; an exhibition on the landscapes depicted by the French Barbizon painters had a similar effect.

== Directors ==
Director	Period	Extra Notes
Abraham Jacobus Servaas van Rooijen (1839–1925)	1 January 1887 to 1911	
Hendrik Enno van Gelder (1876–1960)	4 May 1912 to 27 March 1941	temporary director until 1912
Gerhardus Knuttel Wzn (1889–1968)	1 April 1941 to 1 March 1948	During the imprisonment of G. Knuttel (4 May 1942 to 7 May 1945) during the German occupation, Dirk Balfoort (1886–1964) was the acting director. Balfoort also fulfilled this role during Knuttel's illness from 3 March 1947.
Victorine Hefting (1905–1993)	1 March 1948 to 19 August 1950	First female museum director in the Netherlands.
Dirk Balfoort (1886–1964)	19 August 1950 to 1 June 1951	as acting director
Louis Wijsenbeek (1912–1985)	1 June 1951 to 1 June 1977	
Theo van Velzen (1924–1999)	1 June 1977 to 1 June 1986	
Henk Overduin (1943–1988)	1 June 1986 to November 1987	as interim director
Rudi Fuchs (1942)	November 1987 to 31 January 1993	
Hans Locher (1938)	1 February 1993 to 31 August 2000	interim director from 1 February 1993 to 31 December 1993
Wim van Krimpen (1941)	1 September 2000 tot 31 December 2008	
Benno Tempel (1972)	1 January 2009 to 1 November 2023	
Margriet Schavemaker (1971)	1 June 2024	

== Images from the museum ==
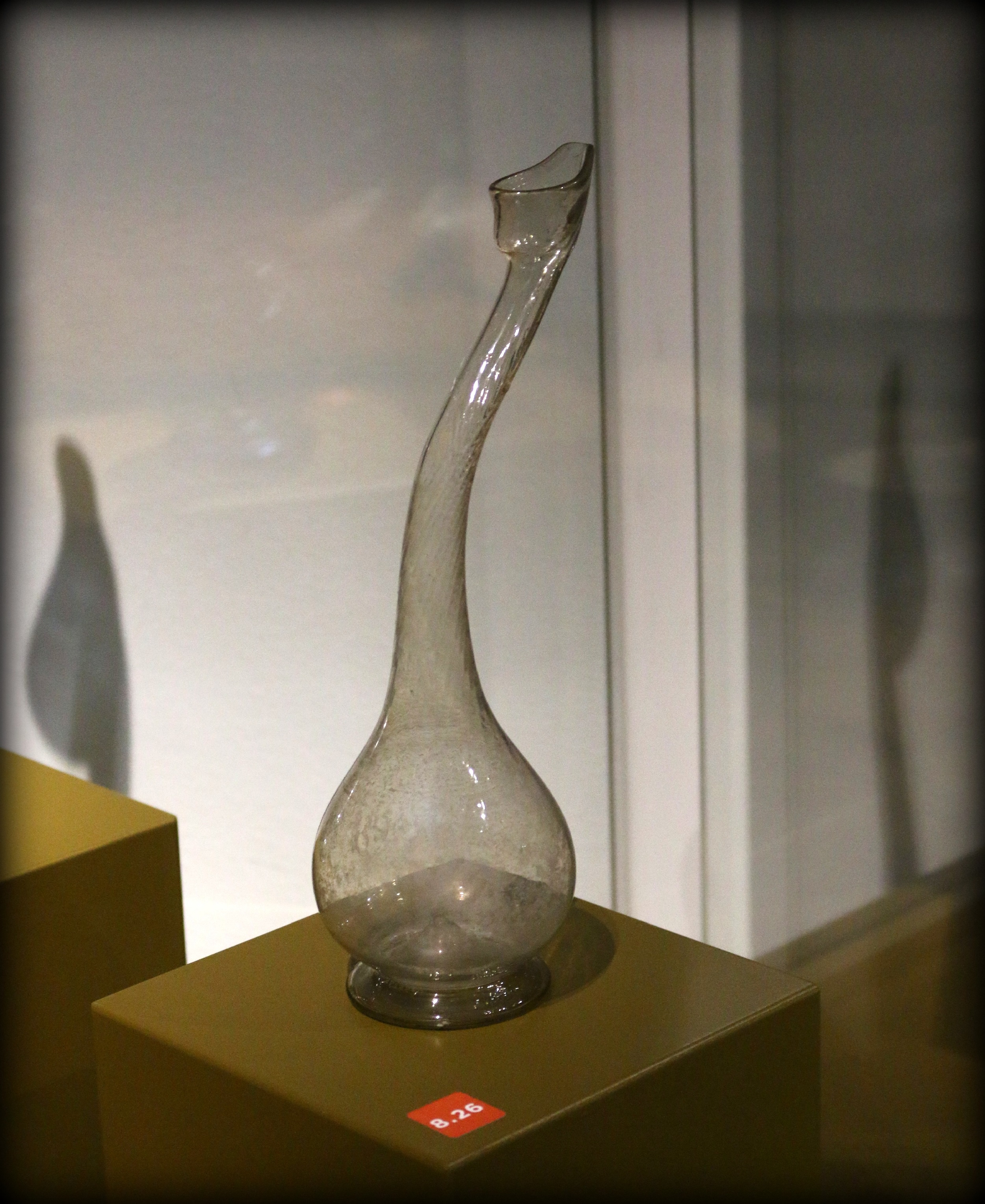
19th-century glass from Persia at museum

Pablo Picasso, 1910, Woman with Mustard Pot

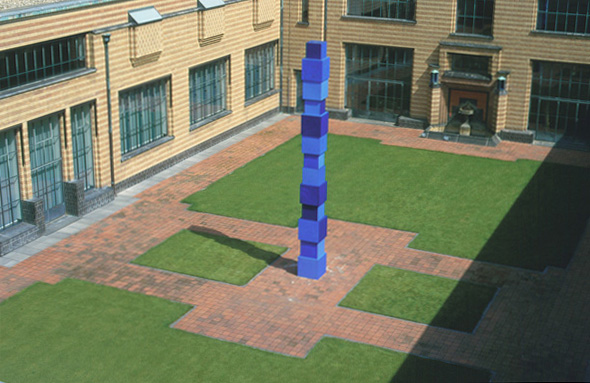
Jürgen Partenheimer, Weltachse V, installation Gemeentemuseum Den Haag, 1999

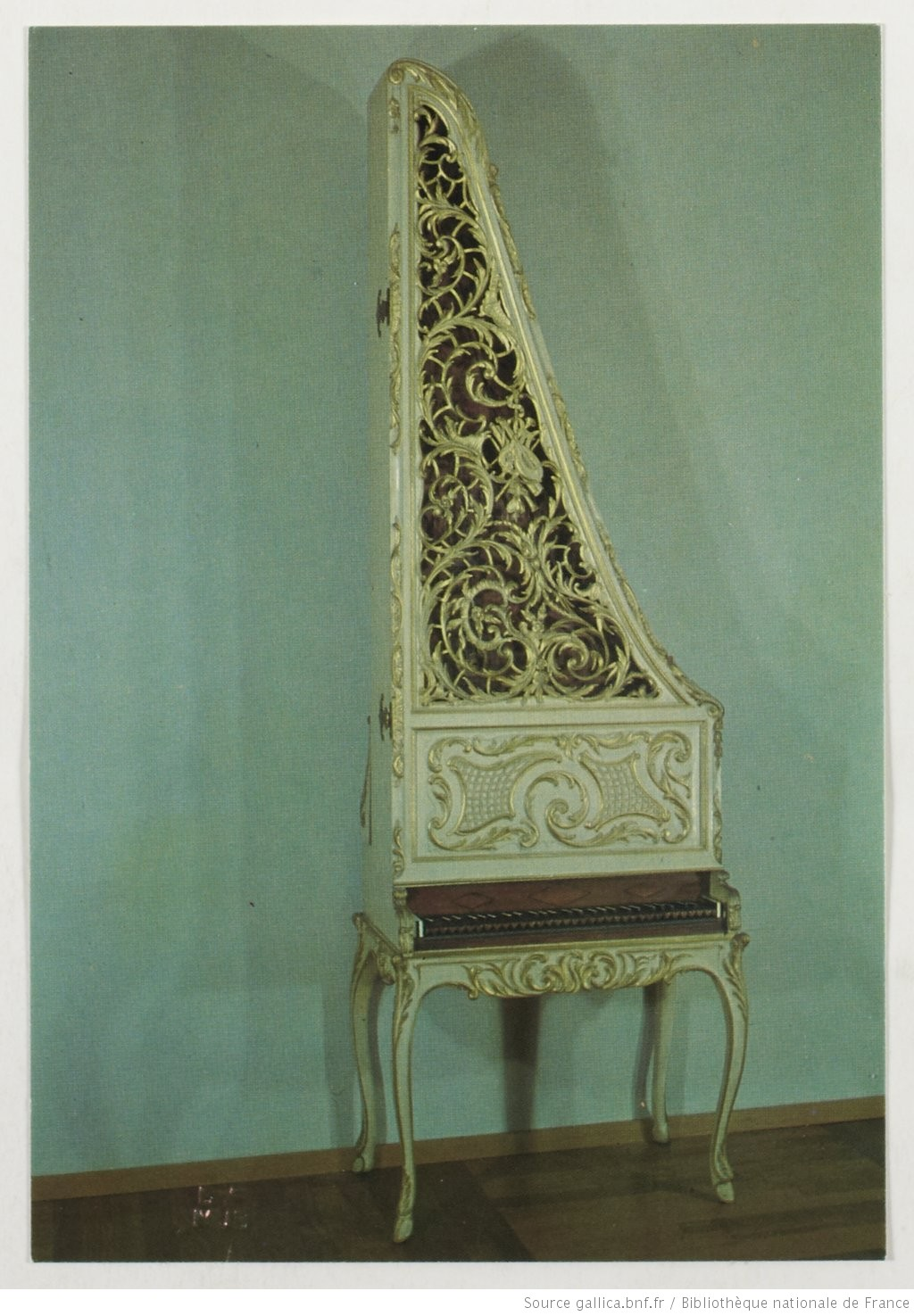
Clavicytherium by Albert Delin ca.1760
