= Dagradi =

Dagradi is a surname. Notable people with the surname include:

- Chris Dagradi (born 1954), American artist
- Don DaGradi (1911–1991), American Disney writer who co-wrote the screenplay for Mary Poppins
