= List of Dutch ceramists =

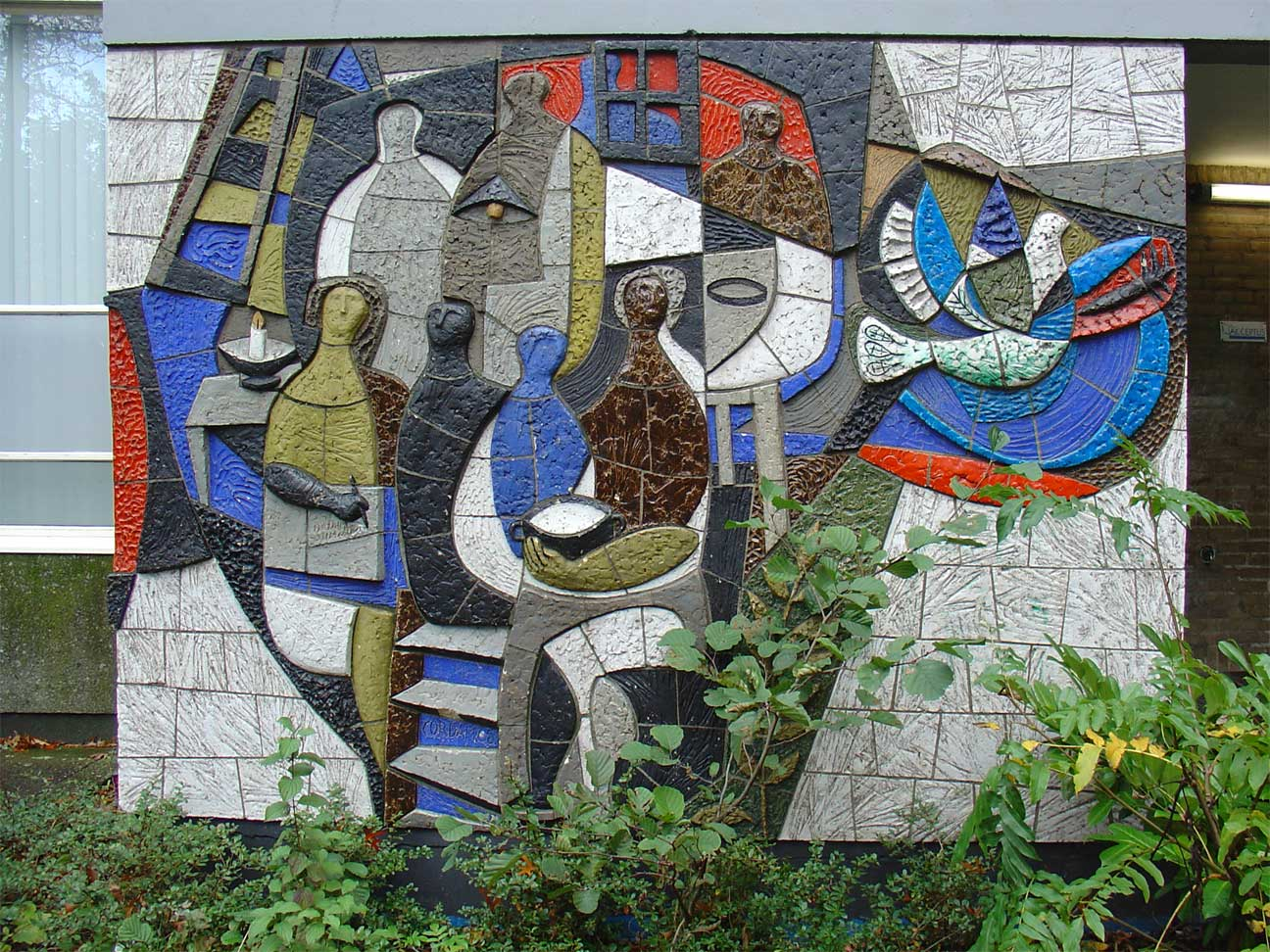
Cor Dam: Anne Frank, Gouda.

This is a list of Dutch ceramists who were born and/or were primarily active in the Netherlands.

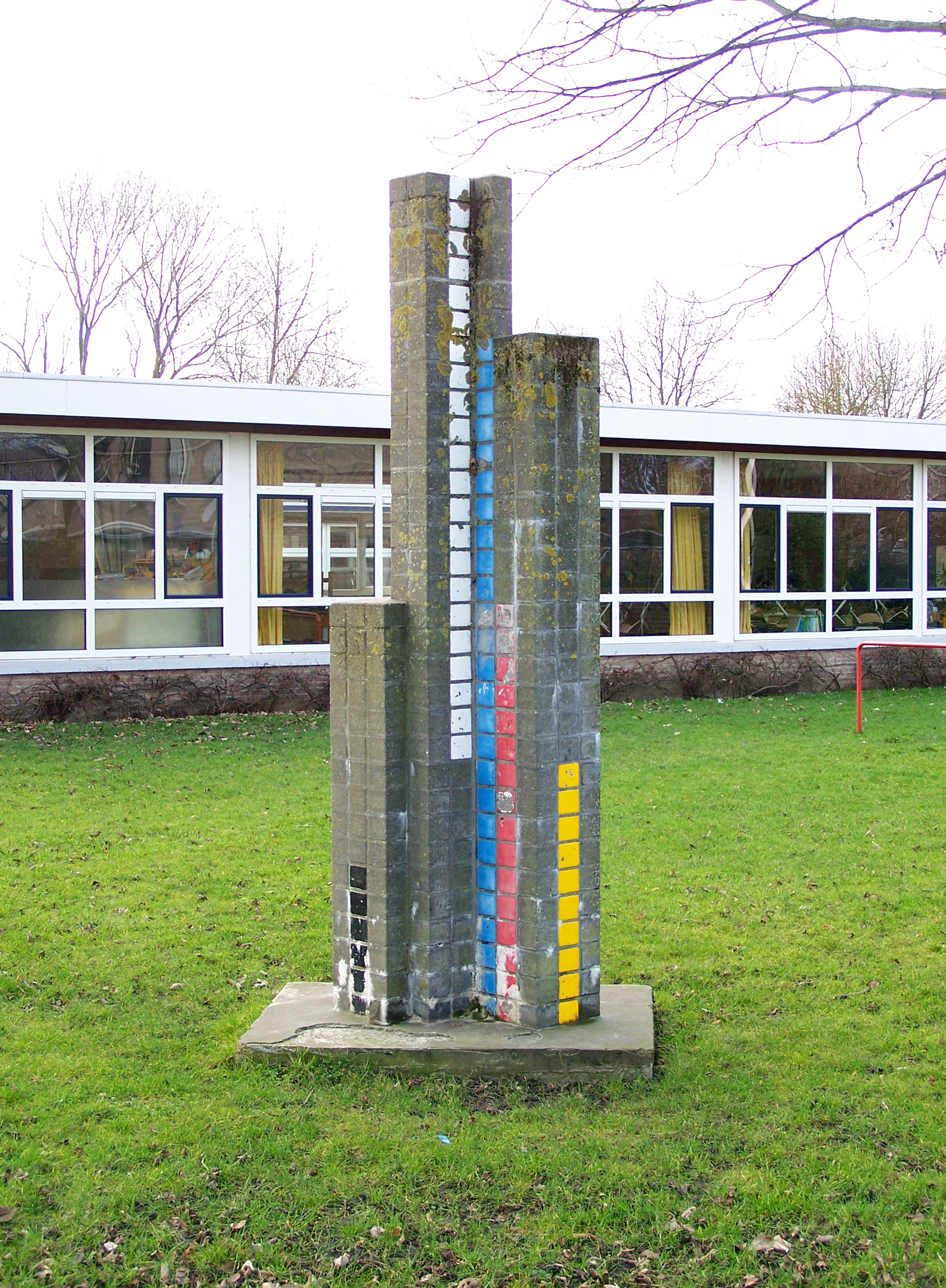
Theo Dobbelman: without title (1980), Heerhugowaard.

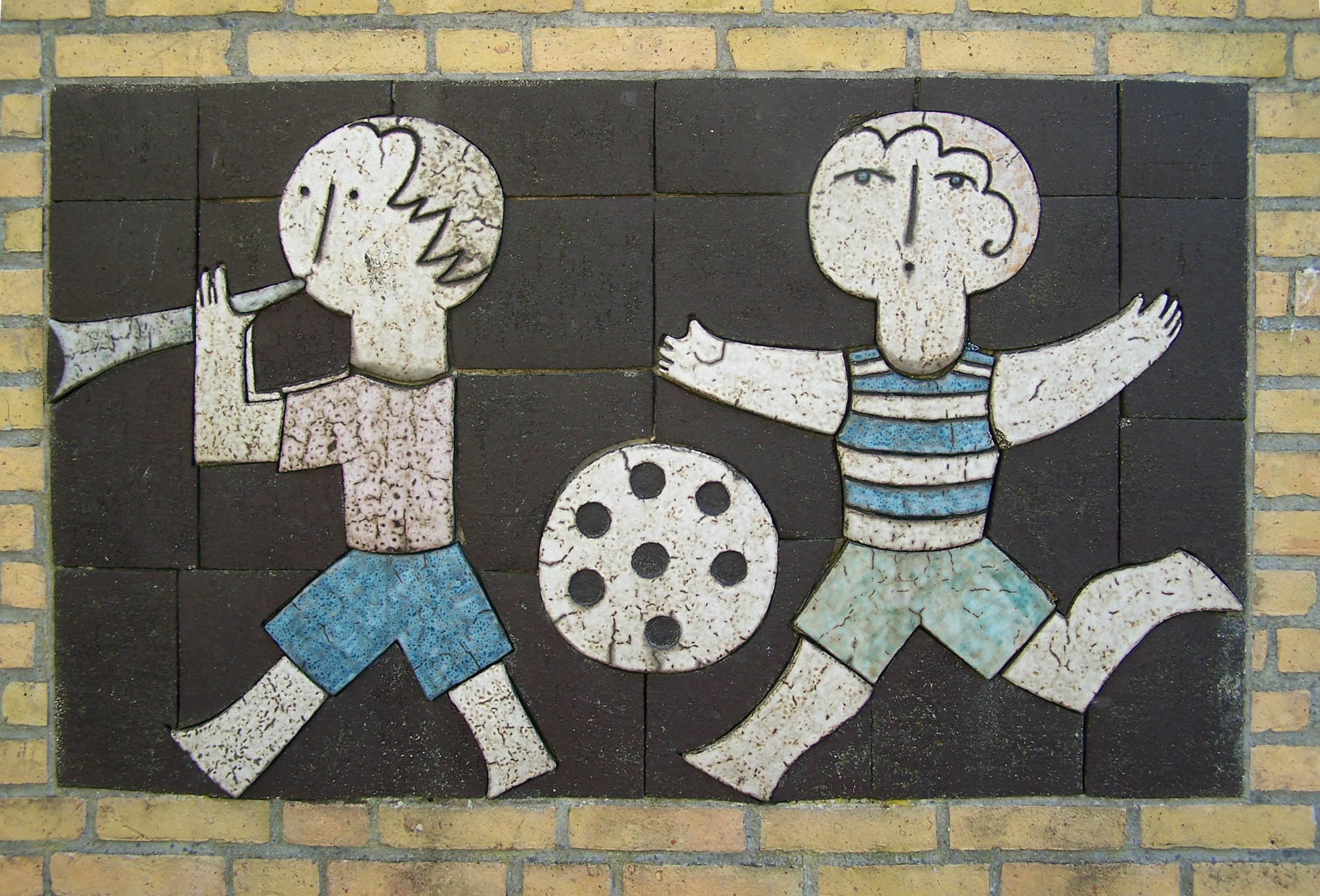
Hannie Mein: playing children, Leeuwarden.

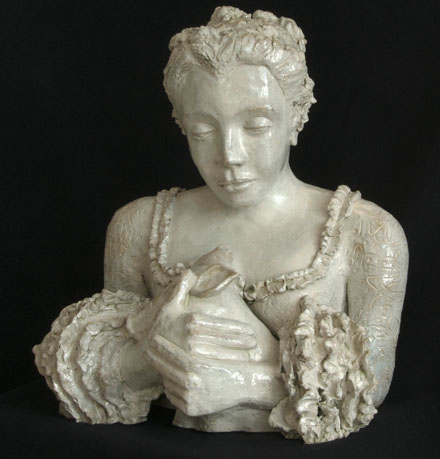
Lia van Rhijn: Marie Antoinette

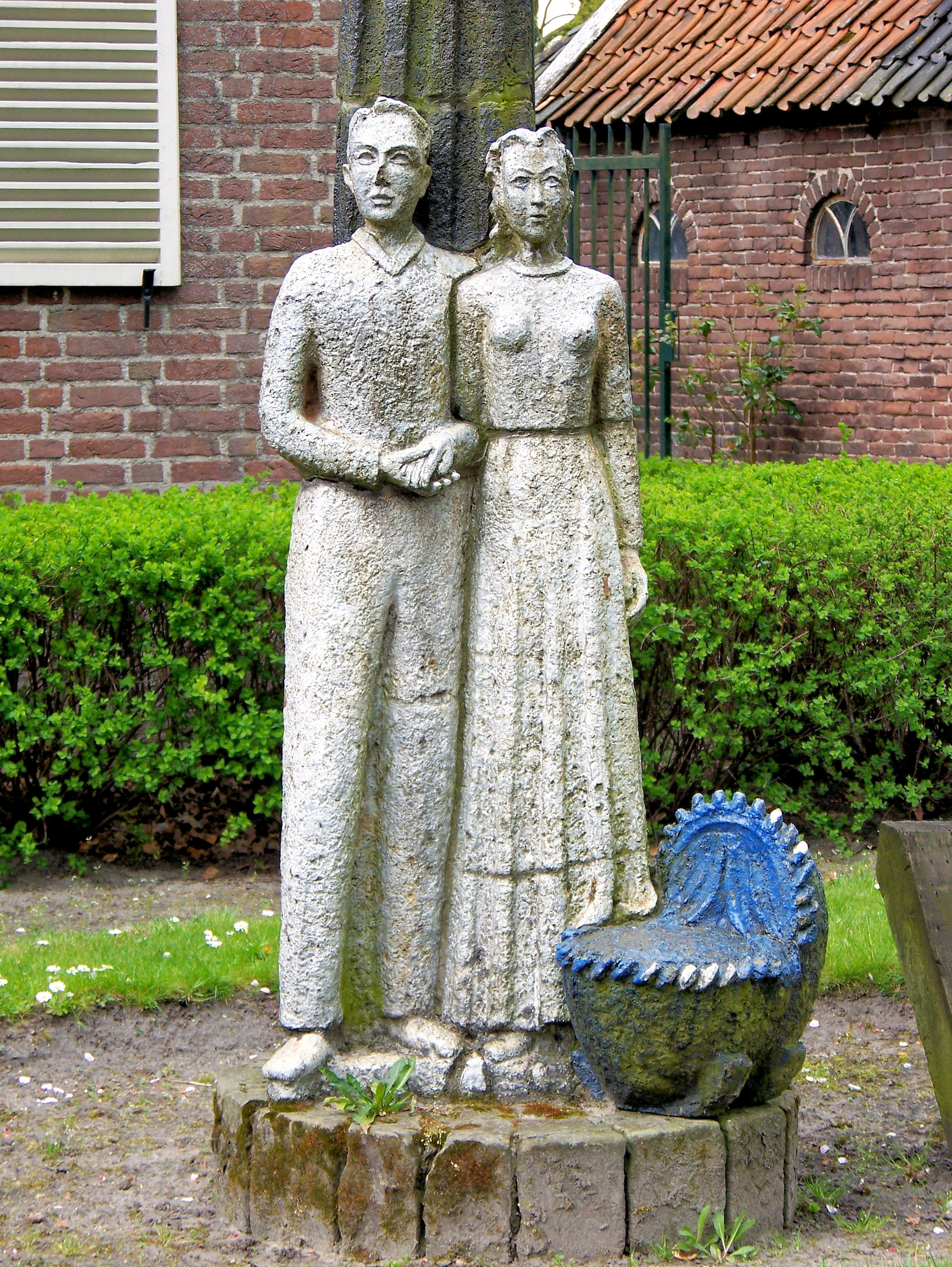
Anno Smith: The live (1959), Diever.

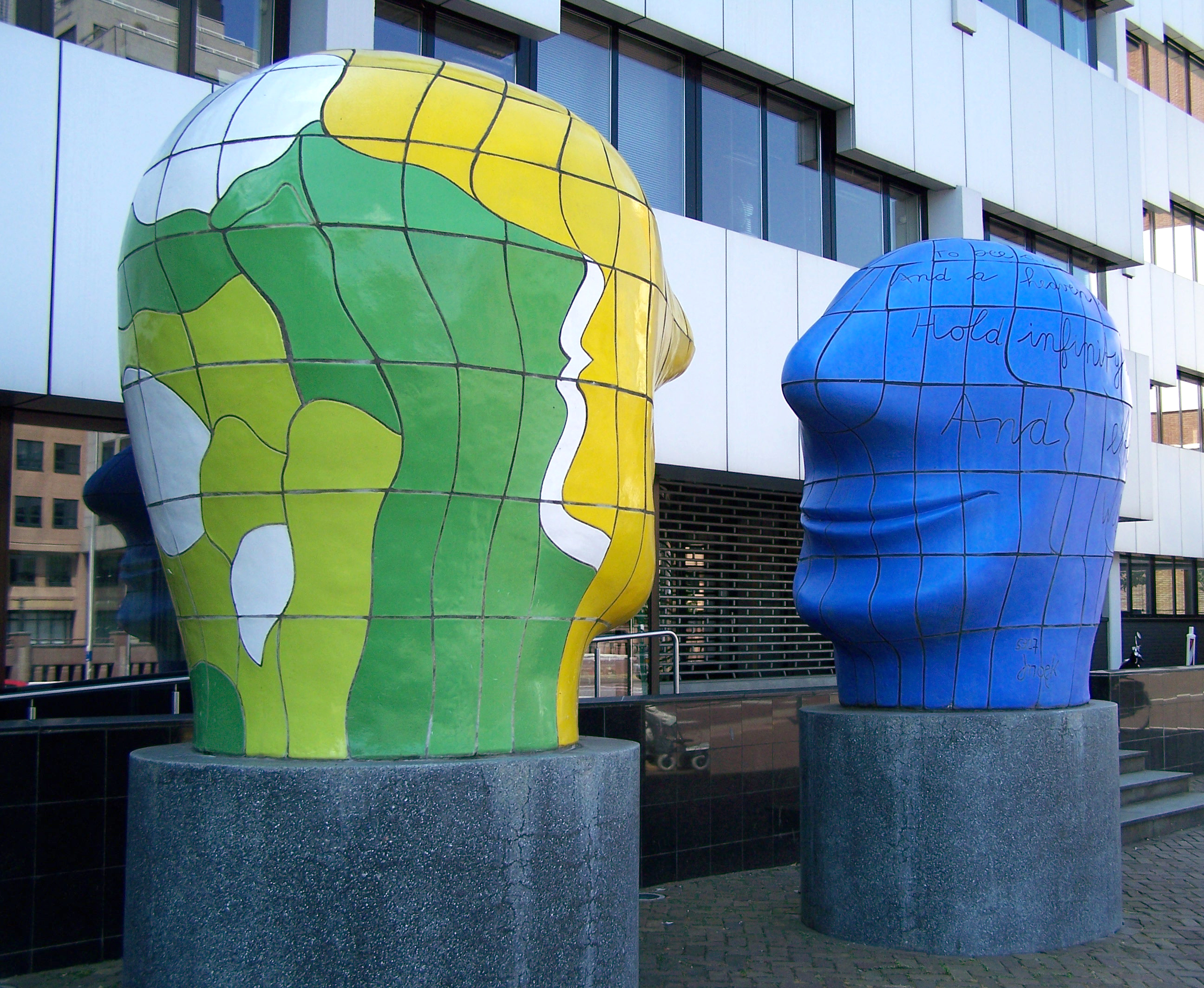
Jan Snoeck: Dialoog (2001), Deventer.

== A ==
- Cris Agterberg (1883–1948)
- Aalmis (1674–1755)
- Karel Appel (1921–2006)
- Govert-Marinus Augustijn (1871–1963)

== B ==
- Gerrit de Blanken (1894–1961)
- Henk Breuker (1914–2003)
- Hugo Brouwer (1913–1986)
- Willem Coenraad Brouwer (1877–1933)

== C ==
- Carel Adolph Lion Cachet (1864–1945)
- Theo Colenbrander (1841–1930)
- Lies Cosijn (April 25, 1931 – February 23, 2016)

== D ==
- Chris Dagradi (born 1954), American artist
- Cor Dam (1935–2019)
- Emmy van Deventer (1915–1998)
- Just van Deventer (1906–1957)
- Sophie van der Does de Willebois (1891–1961)
- Theo Dobbelman (1906–1984)
- Dora Dolz (1941–2008)
- Jan van Druten (1916–1993)
- Lydeke von Dülmen Krumpelmann (born 1952)

== E ==
- Dick Elffers (1910–1990)

== F ==
- Chris Fokma (1927–2012)

== G ==
- Guido Geelen (born 1961)
- Jan van Gemert (1921–1991)

== H ==
- Simone Haak (born 1952)
- Berend Hendriks (1918–1997)
- Vilma Henkelman (born 1944)
- Derk Holman (1916–1982)
- Dirk Hubers (1913–2003)

== J ==
- Hans de Jong (1932–2011)
- Hella Jongerius (born 1963)

== K ==
- Harm Kamerlingh Onnes (1893–1985)
- David van de Kop (1937–1994)
- Hildo Krop (1884–1970)

== L ==
- Sonja Landweer (1933–2019)
- Chris Lanooy (1881–1948)
- Geert Lap (1951–2017)
- Wietske van Leeuwen (born 1965)
- Luigi de Lerma (1907–1965)
- Frans Lommen (1921–2005)
- Johan van Loon (1934–2020)

== M ==
- Mark Manders (born 1968)
- Hannie Mein (1933–2003)
- Ary de Milde (1634–1708)
- Frank de Miranda (1913–1986)

== N ==
- Barbara Nanning (born 1957)
- Bert Nienhuis (1873–1960)
- Herman Nieweg (1932–1999)
- Pepijn van den Nieuwendijk (born 1970)
- Theo Nieuwenhuis (1866–1951)

== P ==
- Gerrit Patist (1947–2005)
- Joop Puntman (1934–2013)

== Q ==
- Leen Quist (1942–2014)

== R ==
- Kees van Renssen (born 1941)
- Judith Révész (1915–2018)
- Lia van Rhijn (born 1953)
- Johnny Rolf (born 1936)
- Jan de Rooden (1931–2016)

== S ==
- Karel Sluijterman (1863–1931)
- Cornelis van der Sluys (1881–1944)
- Anno Smith (1915–1990)
- Jan Snoeck (1927–2018)
- Pieter Stockmans (born 1940), Belgian artist
- Jan van Stolk (1920–1997)

== T ==
- Henk Trumpie (born 1937)

== V ==
- Jan van der Vaart (1931–2000)
- Thierry Veltman (born 1939)
- Toon Verhoef (born 1946)
- Sophie Verrijn Stuart (1890–1946)
- Willem Jansz Verstraeten (c.1594–1655)
- Bouke de Vries (born 1960)

== W ==
- Piet Wiegman (1885–1963)

== See also ==
- Gallery Terra Delft
- List of Dutch artists
- List of Dutch sculptors
- List of studio potters
