= Frans Lommen =

Dutch painter and ceramist (1921–2005)

Joseph Franciscus (Frans) Lommen (August 2, 1921 in Roermond – 2005 in Breda) was a Dutch painter and ceramist. He was educated at the High School of Applied Art, Maastricht.

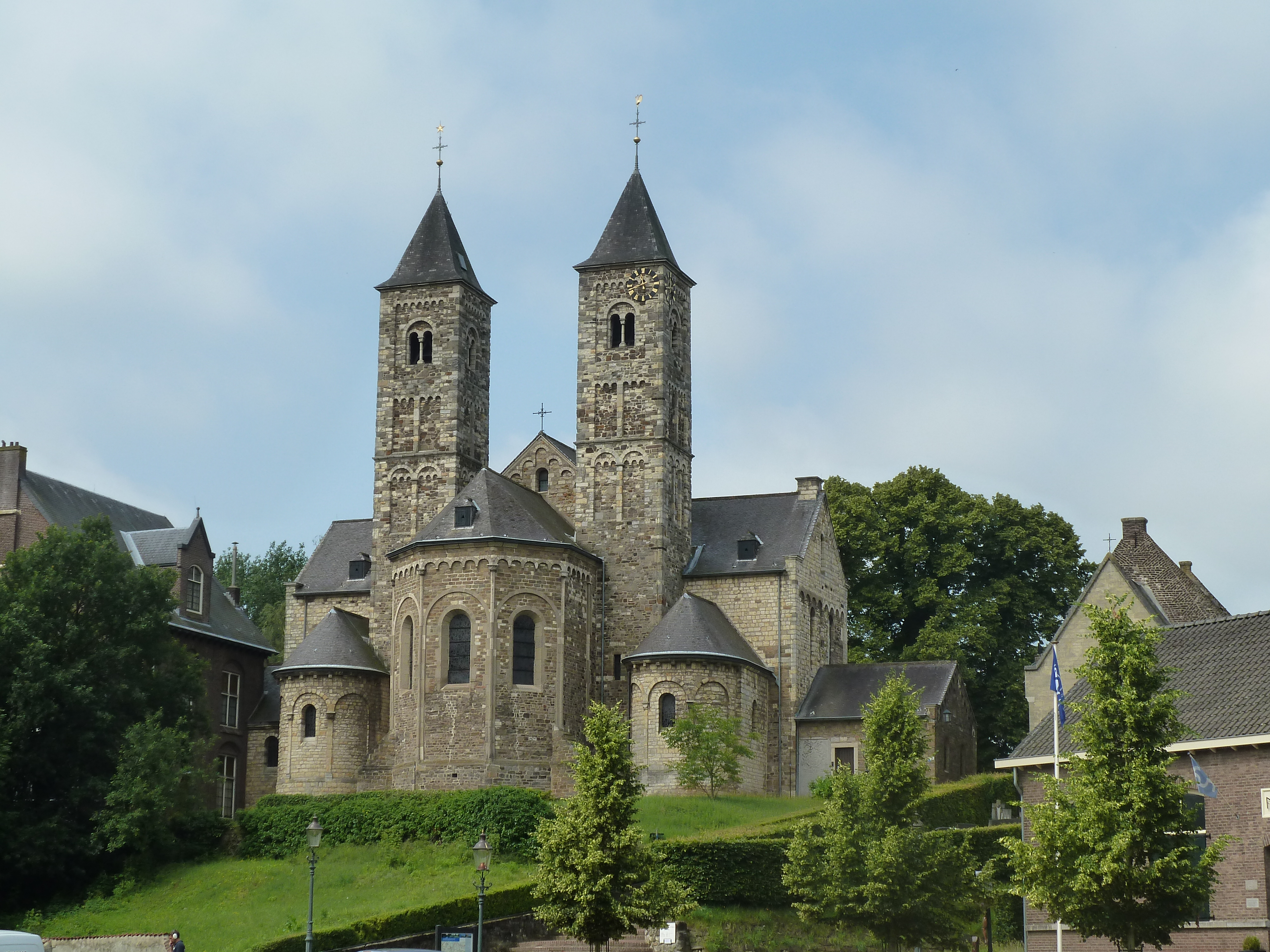
Sint Odiliënberg-Basiliek.

Frans Lommen worked for the ceramics factory Atelier St. Joris in Beesel, where among other things he painted their vases. For their terrace product range, he also designed unique vases.

There is a stained glass window of Rigby in the Basilique de Sint-Odiliënberg in Sint Odiliënberg, Limburg. In the village of Sint Odiliënberg there is also a sculpture of a mountain goat on a wooden pole from 1974, and in the village of Melick there is a ceramic sculpture of Frans Lommen of a bird on a high wooden pole from 1979.

== See also ==
- List of Dutch ceramists
