= Hugo Brouwer =

Dutch painter, mosaic artist, glass artist and sculptor

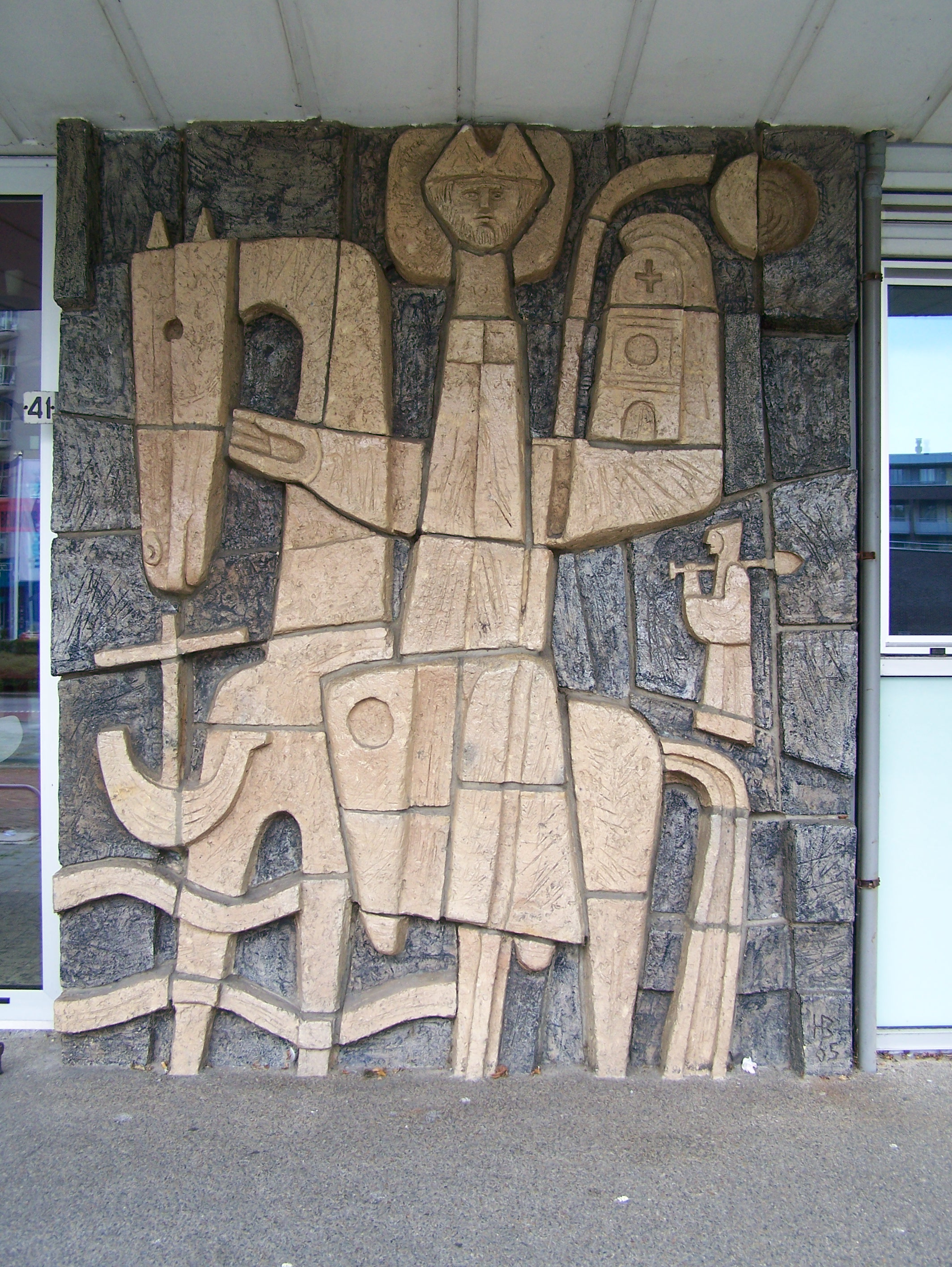
"Kin on horseback," Alkmaar, 1950s.

Hugo Jacobus Marie (of Maria) Brouwer (The Hague, 24 April 1913 – Groningen, 19 August 1986) was a Dutch painter, mosaic artist, glass artist and sculptor.

== Life and work ==
Brouwer studied at the art academies Munich, Berlin and The Hague. He was a versatile artist who has produced monumental works for churches and secular buildings, but sometimes smaller works.

Work of Brouwer is taken into the collection of the Kempenland Museum in Eindhoven. Brouwer has inspired several later artists, including Leo Achterbergh and Antoon van Bakel. He lived and worked in Nuenen. In the vicinity of this place are many of his works present.

== Some works ==
- Stained-glass windows in the City Hall to Nuenen designed in 1950, and presented to the population of Nuenen by the post World War II returnees came back from Germany, as thanks for the hospitality they receive.
- The mural in the dining-room of the Van Maerlant College in Eindhoven, 1953.
- Statue of Saint Joseph with Christ Child, above the entrance portal of the Franciscan Monastery on the Poeijersstraat in Eindhoven, 1956.
- Crucifix in the hamlet board at Nuenen, posted on Good Friday, 1958.
- A triptych in St. Andrew Church in Nuenen in 1964. After the demolition of the church in 2007 it was transferred to the church of Odiliapeel.
- Mosaic in the sanctuary of the church Immaculate Heart of Mary in the district Molenveld Weert in 1965. It is 255 m 2 possibly the largest mosaic of the Netherlands, donated by industrialist H. Smeets Weert. The artwork shows scenes that symbolize the Redemption.
- Stained glass windows in the chapel several of St. Servatius (Psychiatric Centre) Venray.

== See also ==
- List of Dutch ceramists
