= Sophie van der Does de Willebois =

Jonkvrouw Sophie van der Does de Willebois
- Born: 26 November 1891 's-Hertogenbosch, Netherlands
- Died: 11 March 1961 (aged 69); Utrecht, Netherlands
- Known for: Ceramics
- Spouses: Pieter van Stolk (m. 1919; died in 1926) Luigi Eugenio Umberto Giovanni Maria de Lerma (m. 1930)

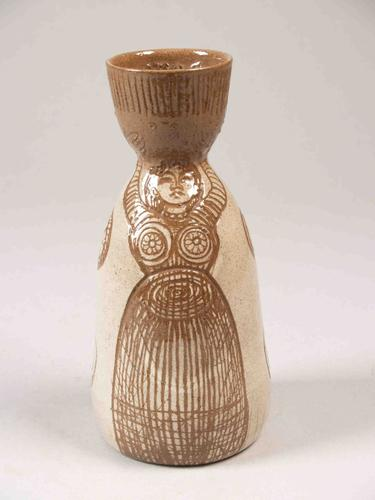
Vase with decoration of two standing female figures by Sophie van der Does de Willebois, 1927-65

Jkvr. Johanna Maria Sophia (Sophie) van der Does de Willebois ('s-Hertogenbosch, 26 November 1891 – Utrecht, 11 March 1961) was a Dutch ceramist.

== Life and work ==
Van der Does de Willebois studied at the Rijksakademie van beeldende kunsten in Amsterdam, where she took painting lessons from Richard Roland Holst. In 1919 she married Adriaan van Stolk (1883-1926). She moved with him to the Canary Islands. They had two children together, Jan van Stolk, who later became a ceramist, and Romualda Bogaerts, who would become a sculptor. In 1925 the family moved to Italy, where it settled in Vietri sul Mare. Van der Does purchased a local factory in maiolica. After the death of her husband in 1926, she worked with the Italian Luigi de Lerma (1907-1965) in the firm.

Van der Does abolished the company in 1928, and moved with the children to the Netherlands. Lerma became the director of "Ceramica Icara" on Rhodes. In 1930 Van der Does moved to Rhodes, where she married De Lerma. In 1934 the family settled in back in the Netherlands in Groenekan, where she and her husband started a pottery. They specialized in decorated dishes with fish, birds and plants. Van der Does also made some sculptures of female figures.

Van der Does was a member of the Dutch Association for Craft and Craft Art (V.A.N.K) and Painting and drawing society Kunstlliefde in Utrecht.

== See also ==
- List of Dutch ceramists
