= Chris Fokma =

Dutch sculptor and ceramist

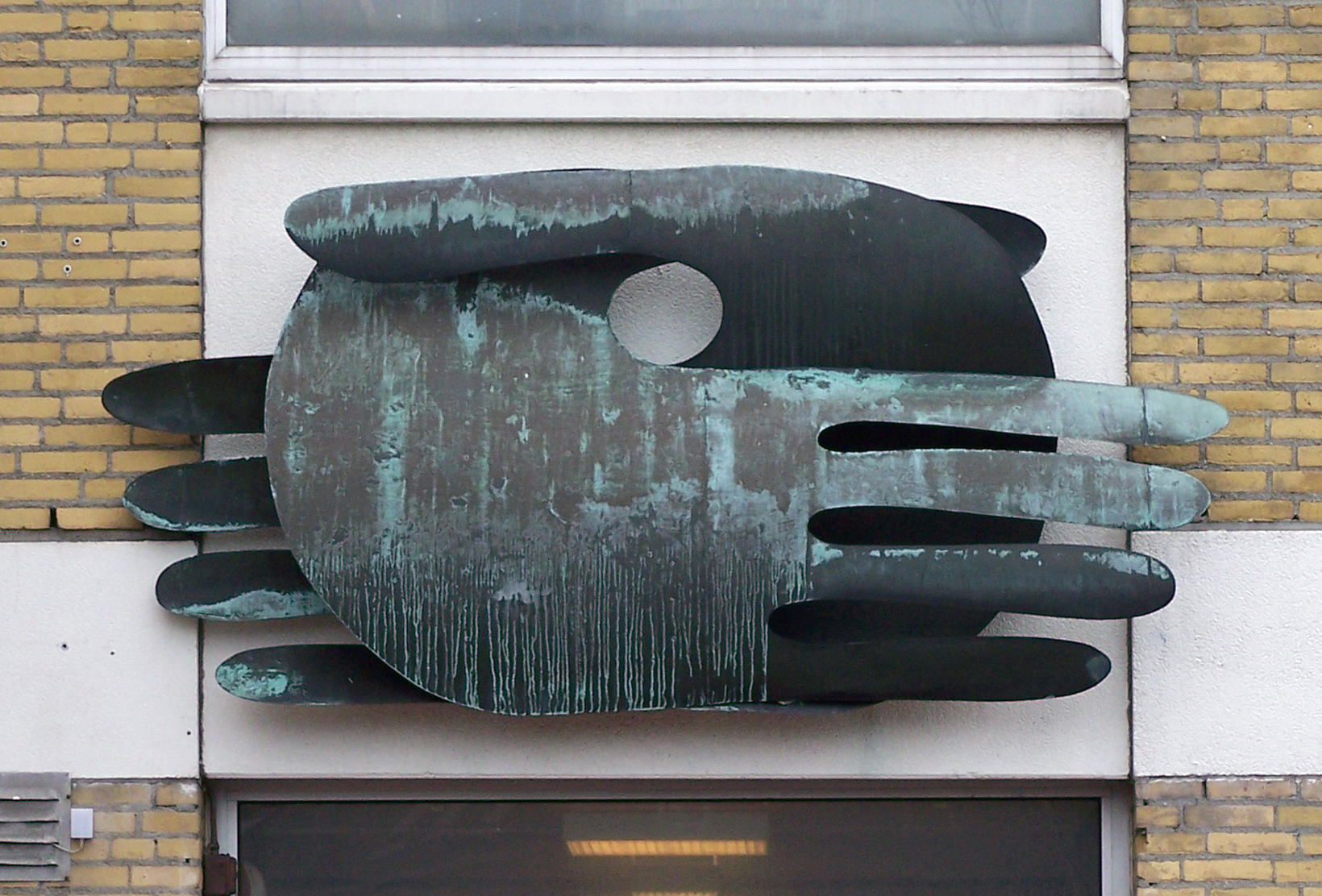
Sculpture "Hands", Leeuwarden.

Christiaan Willem "Chris" Fokma (Oranjewoud, 27 March 1927 - Carhaix-Plouguer, 12 December 2012) was a Dutch sculptor and ceramist.

== Life and work ==
Fokma attended the Hogere Burgerschool (HBS), and studied architecture for one year at the Delft University of Technology, but then switched to the Rijksacademie in Amsterdam. He attended classes by Piet Esser. In 1957 he settled in Leeuwarden, where he spend his entire career. In 1961 he married Anneke Brouwer, who was his agent. After her death in 1998, he quit almost all his activities as an artist. In 2005 he retired to Brittany, France, where he died late 2012.

In addition to free-standing sculptures of bronze or ceramic, Fokma made several wall reliefs, which were usually performed in ceramics, copper or stainless steel. In the 1980 Fokma also started to make sculptures of plexiglass. His Plexiglas wall reliefs were often combined with stainless steel. For 26 years Fokma also lectured at the Academy Vredeman de Vries, School of Applied Arts, and around 1960 some years as art teacher at the Hogere Burgerschool, both in Leeuwarden.

== See also ==
- List of Dutch ceramists
