= Luigi de Lerma =

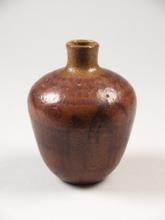
Vase with decoration of branches and rams by Luigi de Lerma, 1950

Eugenio Luigi Umberto Giovanni Maria de Lerma (Reggio Emilia; 30 July 1907 – 20 January 1965 in Utrecht) was an Italian painter and ceramist, who since 1934 worked in the Netherlands.

== Life and work ==
The Lerma majolica techniques at the Instituto della Ceramica in Faenza. He then taught at the School of Applied Arts in Castellamonte. In 1927 he became the technical ceramist in the majolica factory of the Dutch Jonkvrouw Sophie van der Does de Willebois in Vietri sul Mare, and in 1928 he became a director of the ceramics firm I.C.A.R.O. on Rhodes in the Greek Dodecanese.

In 1931 he married with Van der Does and took her and the children from her first marriage to the Netherlands in 1934, including Jan van Stolk. Together they started a ceramic studio in Groenekan, where they mainly produced pottery. In World War II he started to paint. After the war he made several mosaics and murals. In 1953 he won was a challenge trophy and in 1962 was awarded the De Lerma de Johan Kerkhoff price of the Utrecht Society Kunstliefde.

== See also ==
- List of Dutch ceramists
