= Govert-Marinus Augustijn =

Dutch potter

- Born: October 27, 1871; Bergen op Zoom, Netherlands
- Died: May 26, 1963; Hilversum, Netherlands
- Occupation: potter
- Known for: Art Nouveau ceramics, pottery factory De Kat
- Spouse: Cornelia Scriwanek (m. 1906)

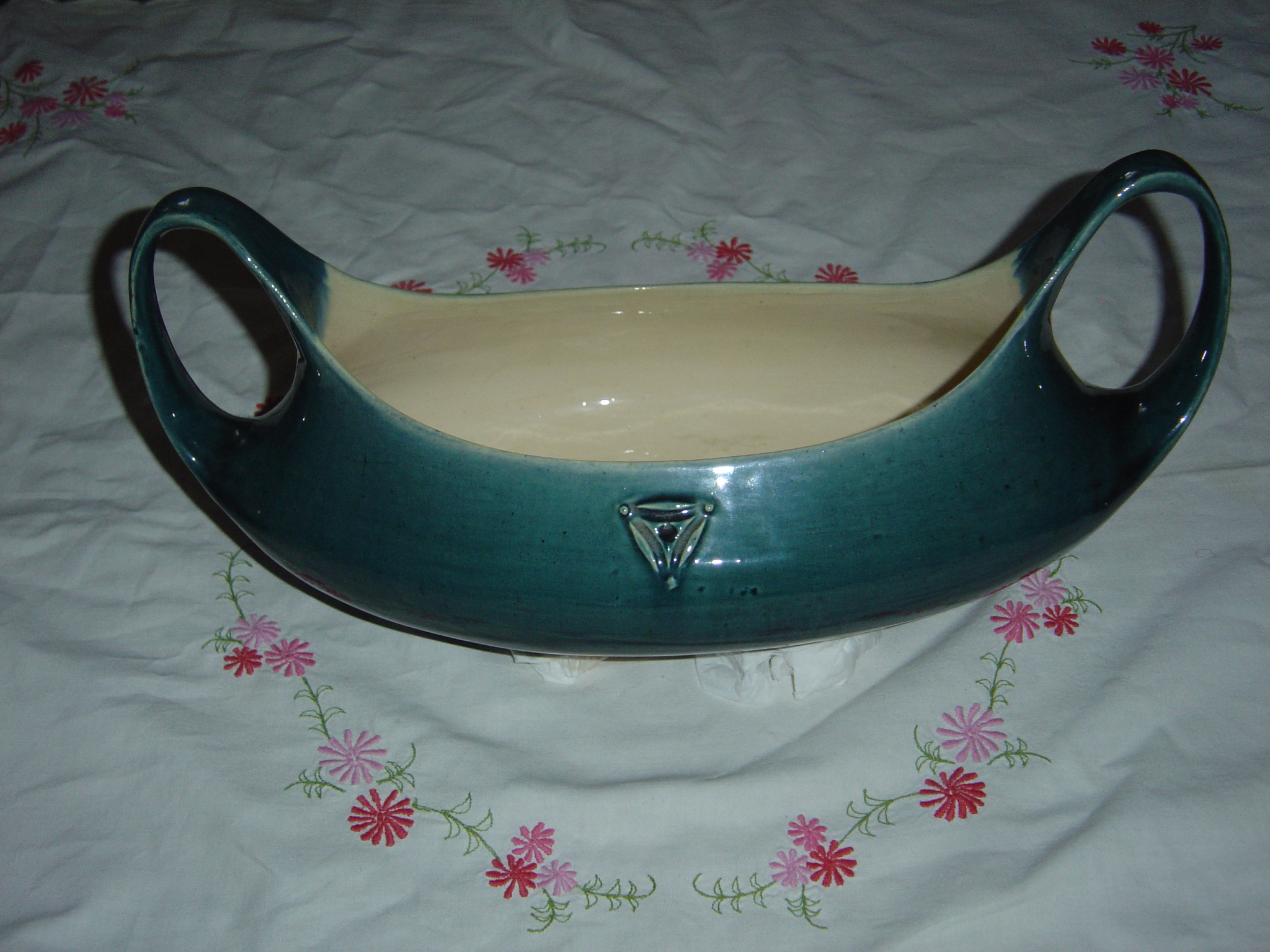
Jardiniere, c. 1900.

Govert-Marinus Augustijn (Bergen op Zoom, 27 October 1871 – Hilversum, 26 May 1963) was a Dutch potter in the style of the Art Nouveau. He was the son of pottery manufacturer Govert Johannes Augustijn and Maria van Dijke.

== Live and work ==
The city of Bergen op Zoom was since the fifteenth century one of the most important centers for the production of ceramics in Europe. A dozen families, including the families Vetten and Augustijn and Augustine, dominated this industry. The family of Govert-Marinus already knew at least six generations of potters, and was descended from Adriaen Augustijn, a master potter, known to have married on December 20, 1661, with Margrieten Jans.

Govert-Marinus was the grandson of Govert Marinus Govertz. Augustijn (1803-1879), a major pottery manufacturer married to Anna Straatman. This Anna was the sister of Lambert Straatman, ship owner and commissioner in Brussels, which was the great-father of the famous Belgian Art Nouveau -decorateur Gabriel Van Dievoet, and architect Henri Van Dievoet.

Govert-Marinus married on May 4, 1906, in Bergen op Zoom with Cornelia Scriwanek, born in Maastricht, April 23, 1873.

== His work and factory De Kat ==
The family of Govert-Marinus from 1758 onwards owned the pottery factory "Kat." Govert-Marinus himself was educated at firm's dependence "Amstelhoek," in Amsterdam, where he learned the modern techniques of those days. In Amsterdam, he became friends with painter Willem van Dort (1875–1949) and Adriaan Disco (1892–1947). In 1902 he returned to Bergen op Zoom, where he started working in the family business. "De Kat" began at that time to produce a series of art deco works. The factory pressed itself a catalog of his works.

== See also ==
- List of Dutch ceramists
