= Cor Dam =

Dutch artist (1935–2019)

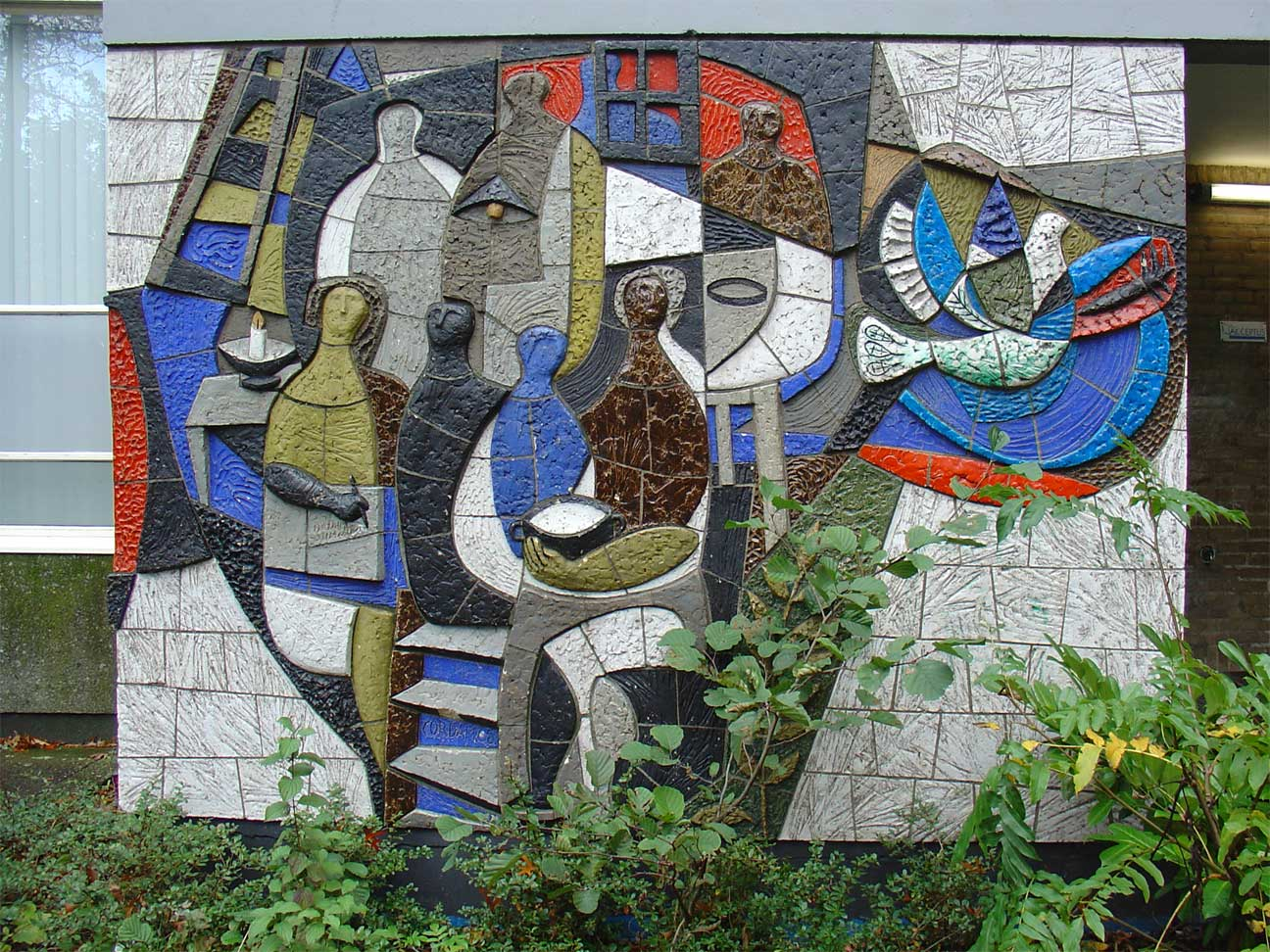
Anne Frankschool Gouda, 1965

Cornelis Dam (26 April 1935 – 29 July 2019) was a Dutch artist, who was a sculptor, painter, illustrator and ceramist.

== Life and work ==
Born in Delft, Dam studied at the Royal Academy of Art in The Hague. After graduating he worked as a designer at the De Koninklijke Porceleyne Fles from 1950 to 1965. Thereafter until 1980, he worked at Ateliers Ceramic Structure 68 in The Hague. Since 1988 he lectured at the Technical University of Delft.

Cor died on 29 July 2019, at the age of 84.

Sculptural works of Dam can be found in the public space of several Dutch cities. For the former Anne Frankschool in Gouda's Oosterwei district, he made a relief (see first image), depicting Anne Frank writing in her diary by candlelight in the attic.

== Works, a selection ==
- Mosaic untitled (1965), Anne Frankschool in Gouda
- Woman with child (1965), Jan van Goyenstraat in Rozenburg
- Ceramic work (1967), Jozef Israelslaan in Woerden
- Women (1968), shopping centre Keizerslanden in Deventer
- Ceramics Shalom (1969) for the Shalomschool in Delft. Since 1984 in the Adelbert church in Delft. [4]
- Brick Mosaic (1970) [5], Ellemare in Rotterdam
- Ceramic object (1983), Industriestraat in Delft
- Four objects (1983), Nieuwe Plantage in Delft
- Untitled - multiple objects (1988), Bergselaan in Rotterdam
- Untitled (1988), Huniadijk in Rotterdam
- Untitled (1988), Cymbelkruid in Rotterdam
- Irascible birds (1996/98), Julianalaan in Schagen

== Gallery ==
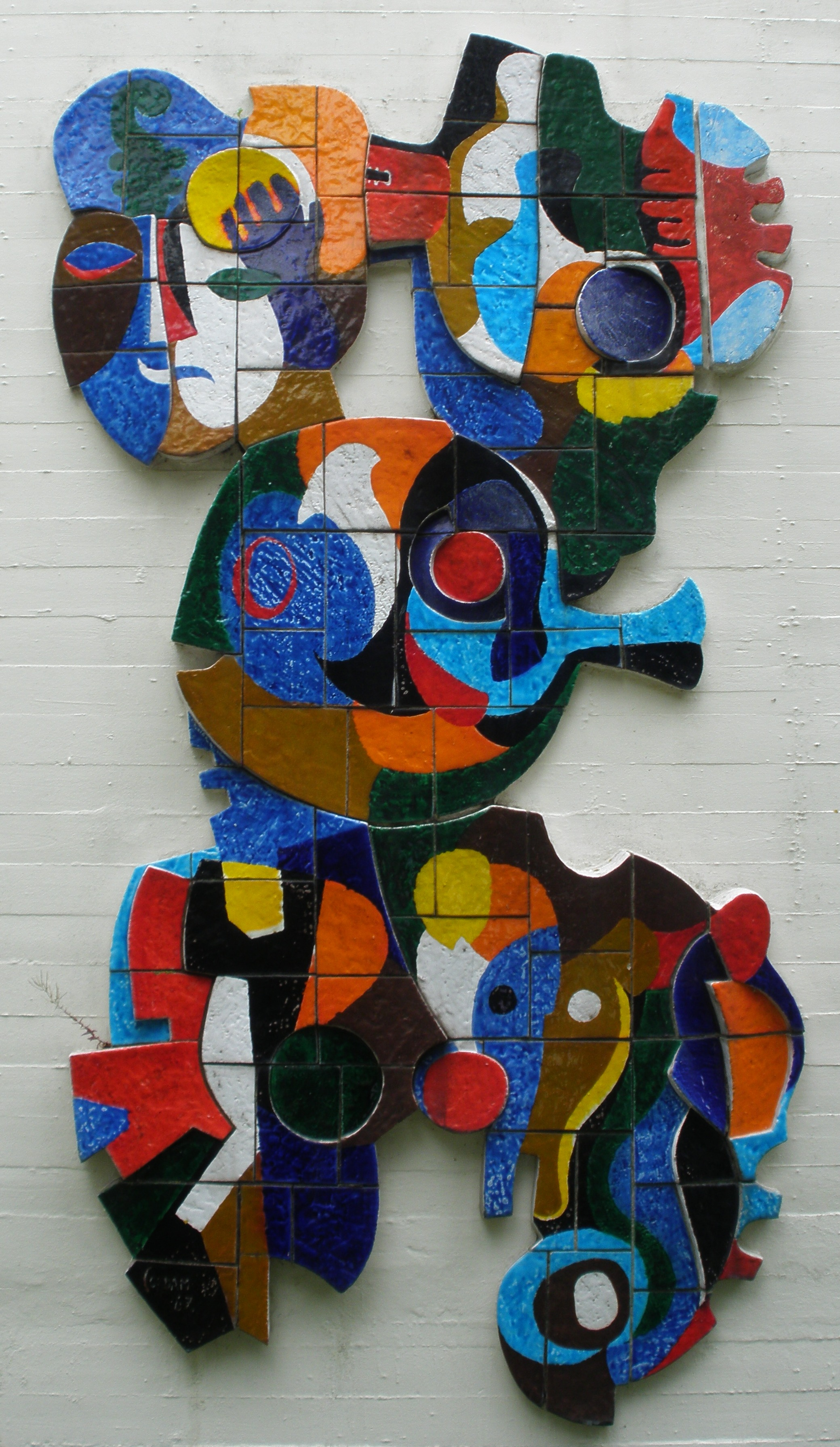
Ceramic work (1967), Woerden

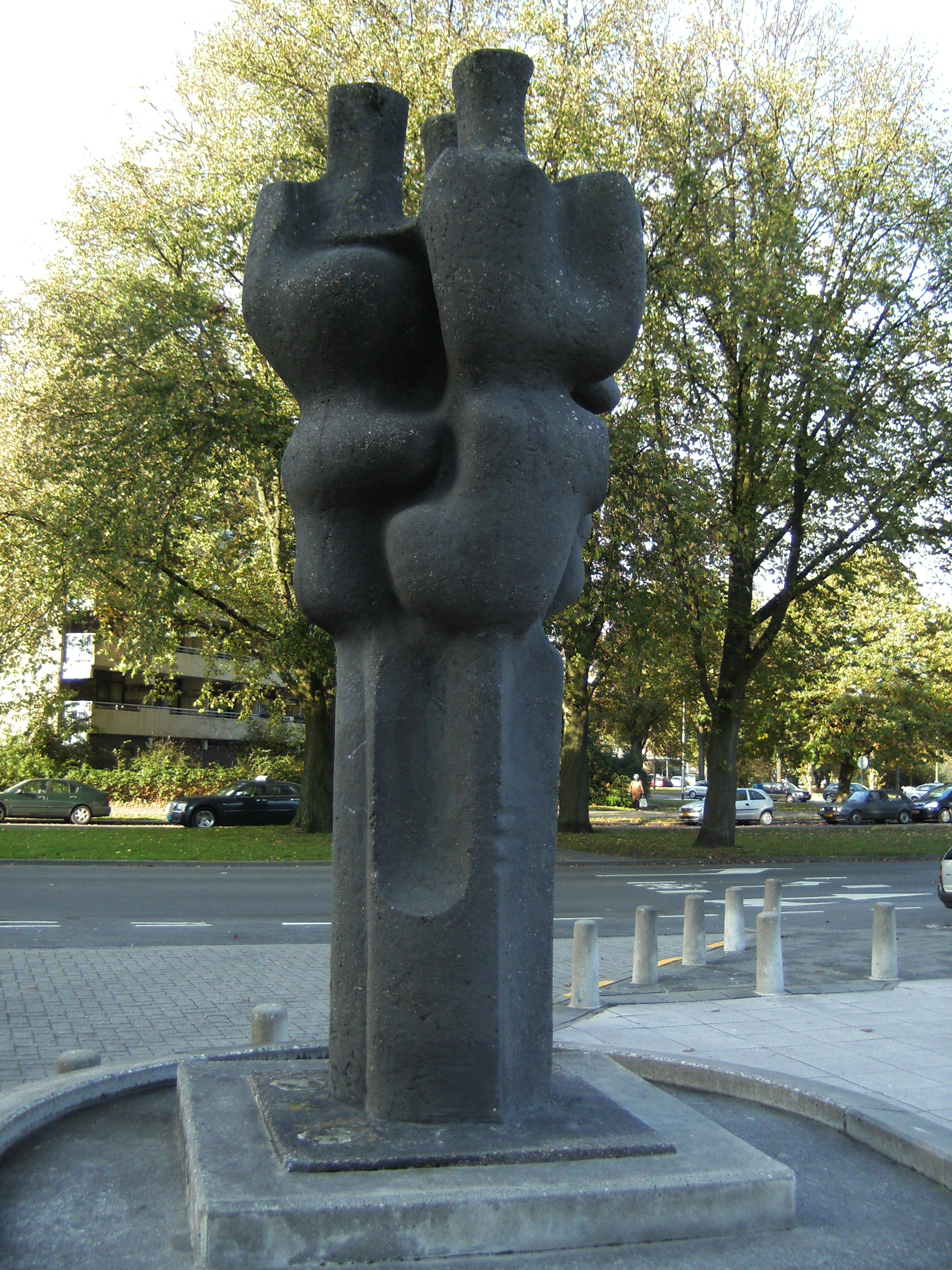
Women (1968), Deventer

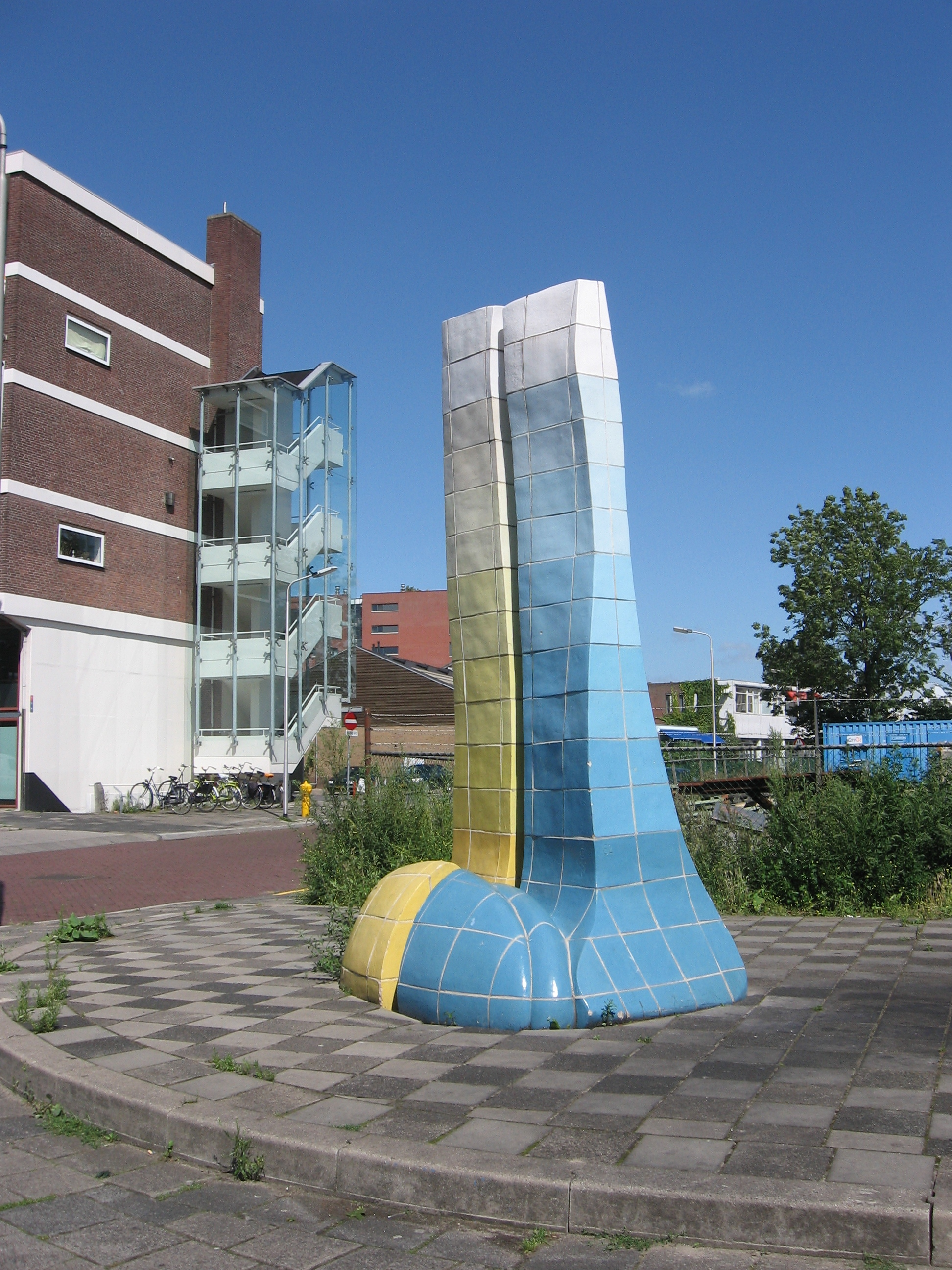
Ceramic object (1983), Delft

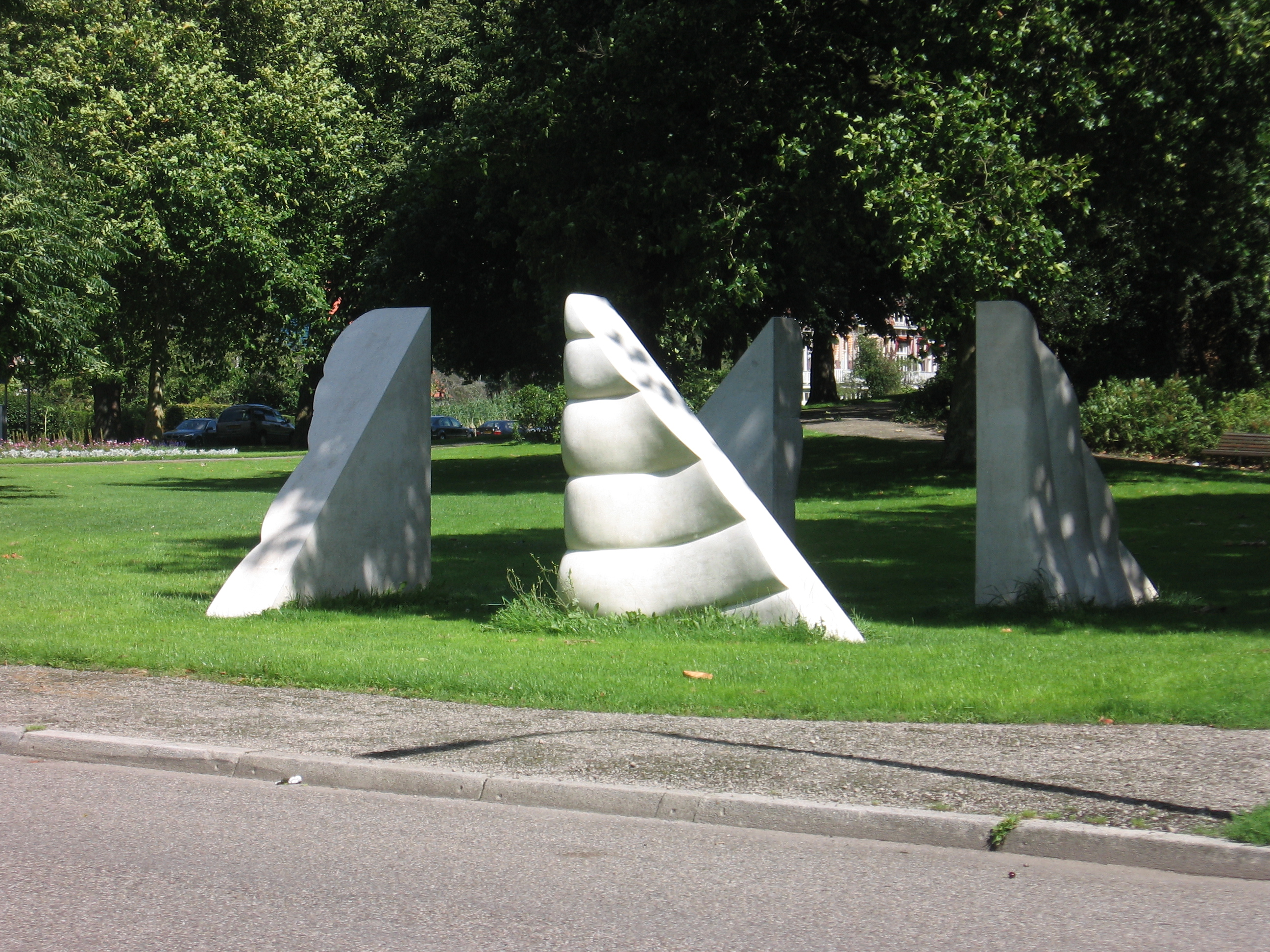
Four objects (1983), Delft

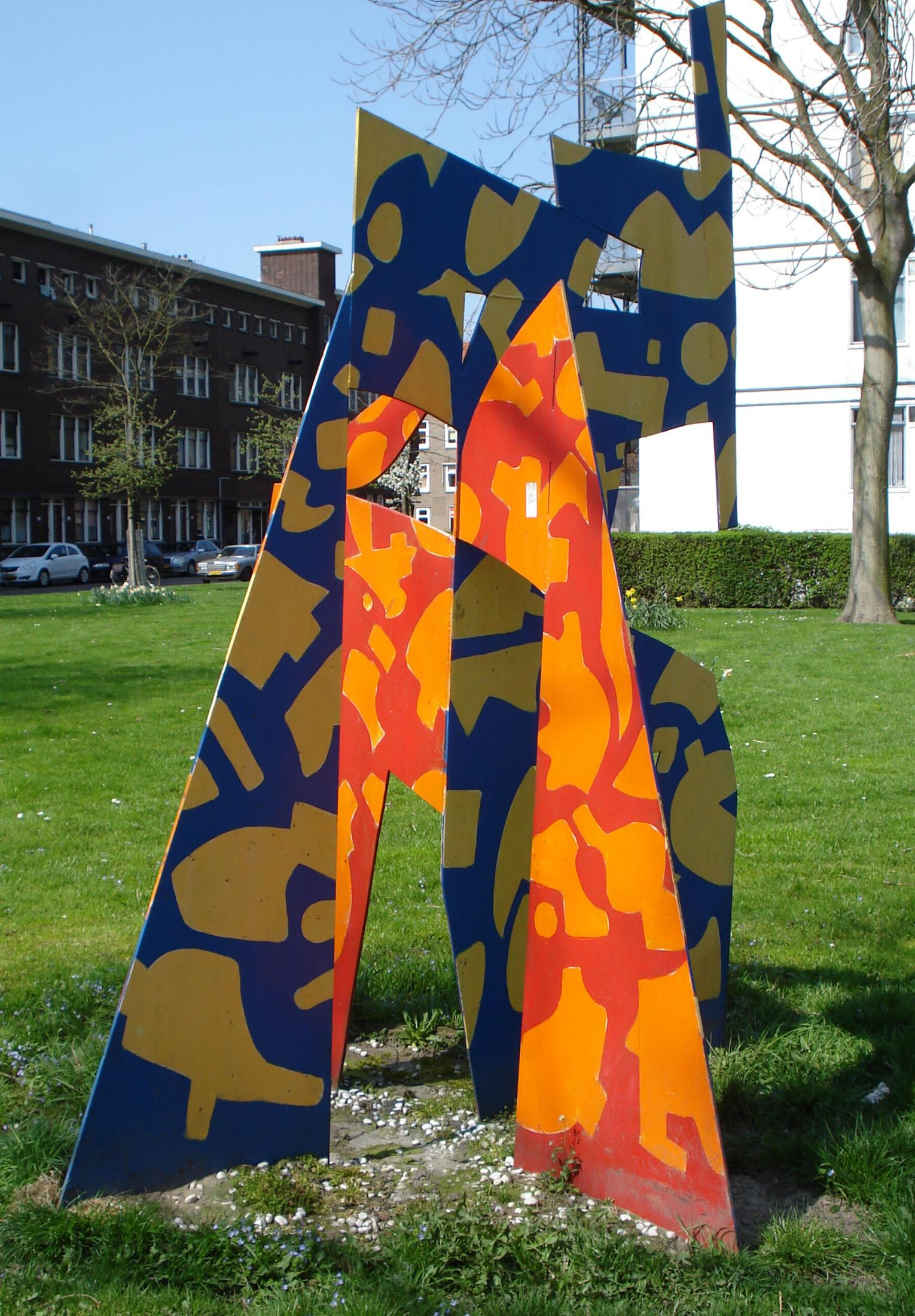
Bergselaan in Rotterdam

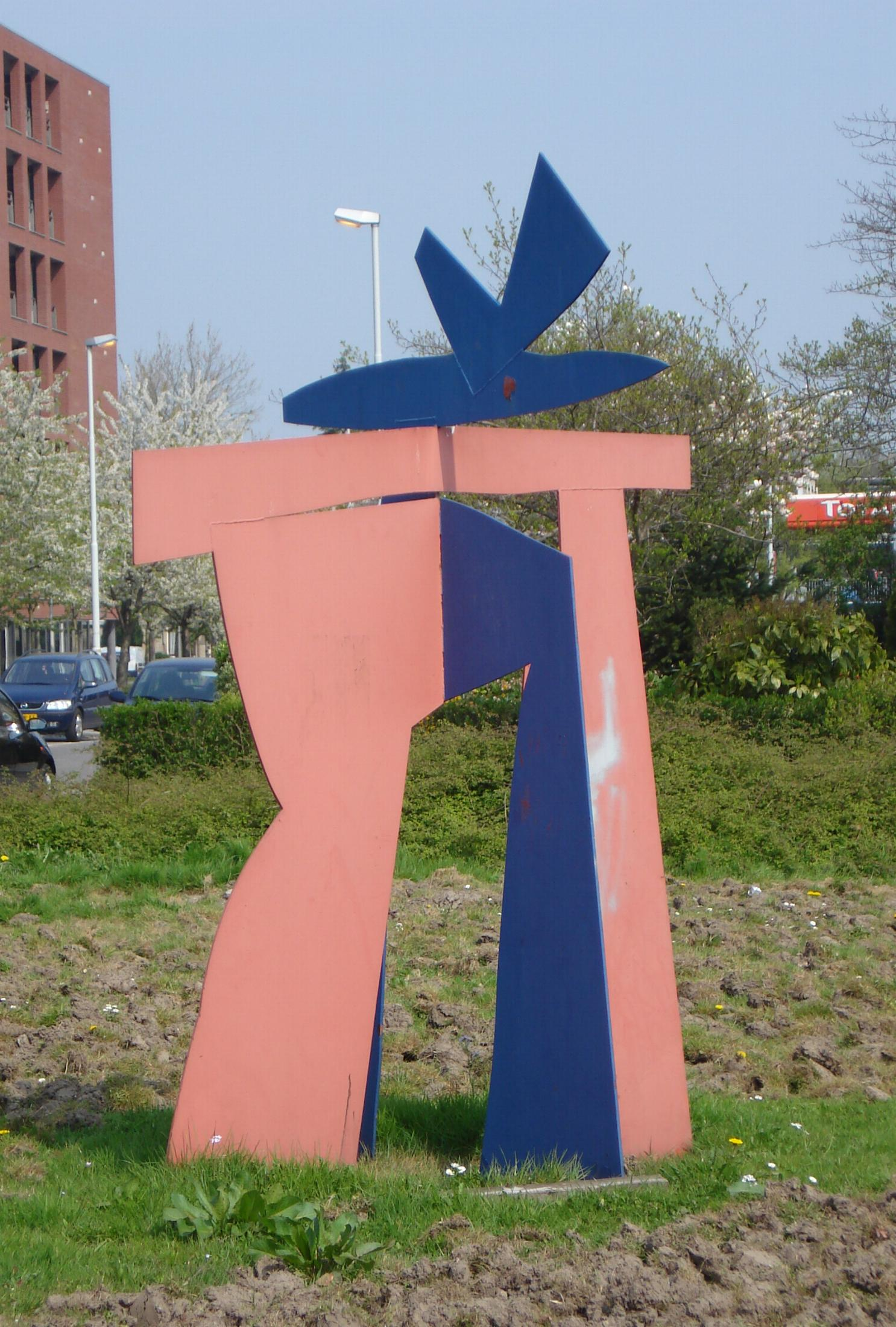
Huniadijk in Rotterdam

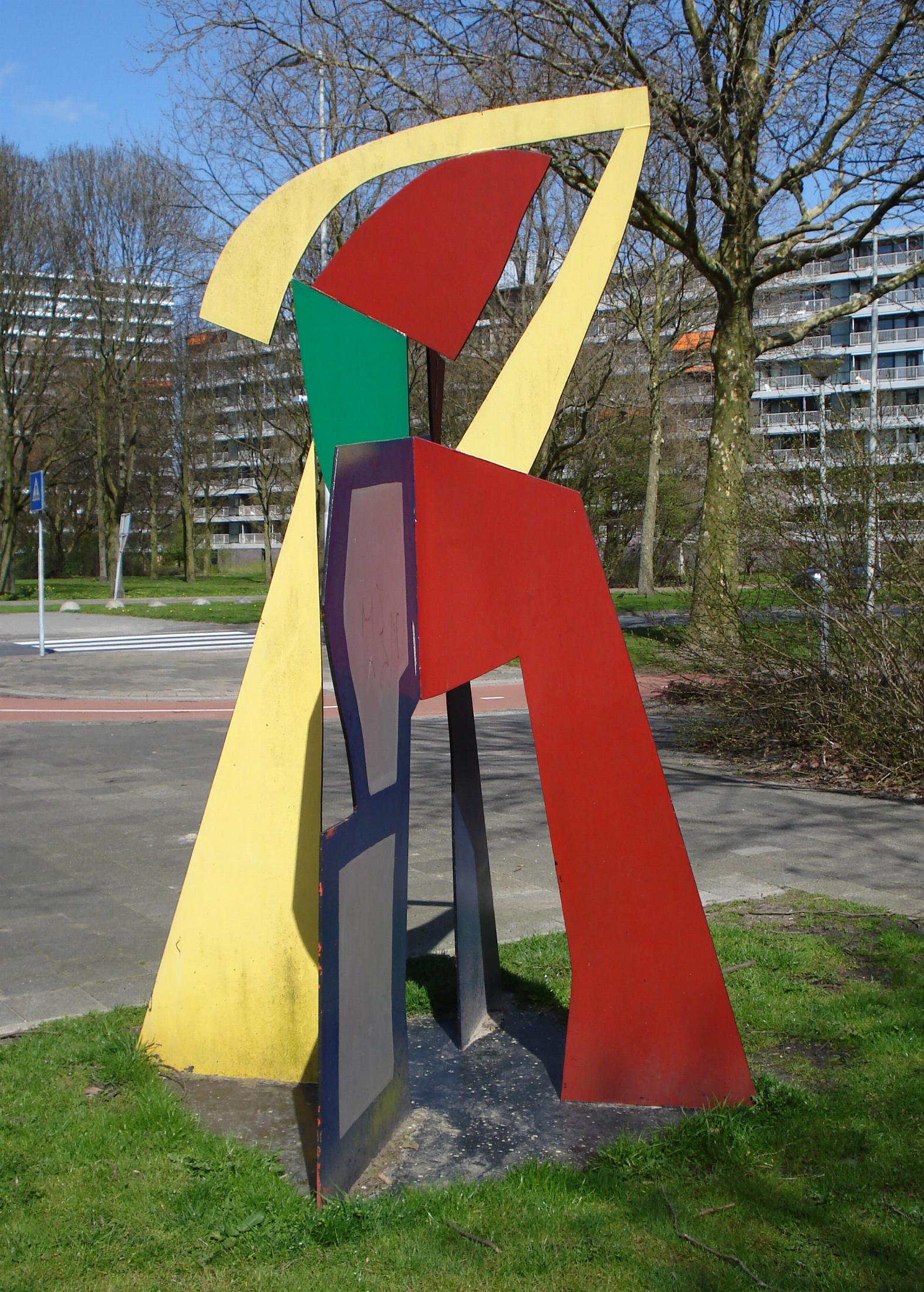
Cymbelkruid in Rotterdam

== See also ==
- List of Dutch ceramists
- List of Dutch sculptors
