= Willem Coenraad Brouwer =

Dutch ceramist and sculptor

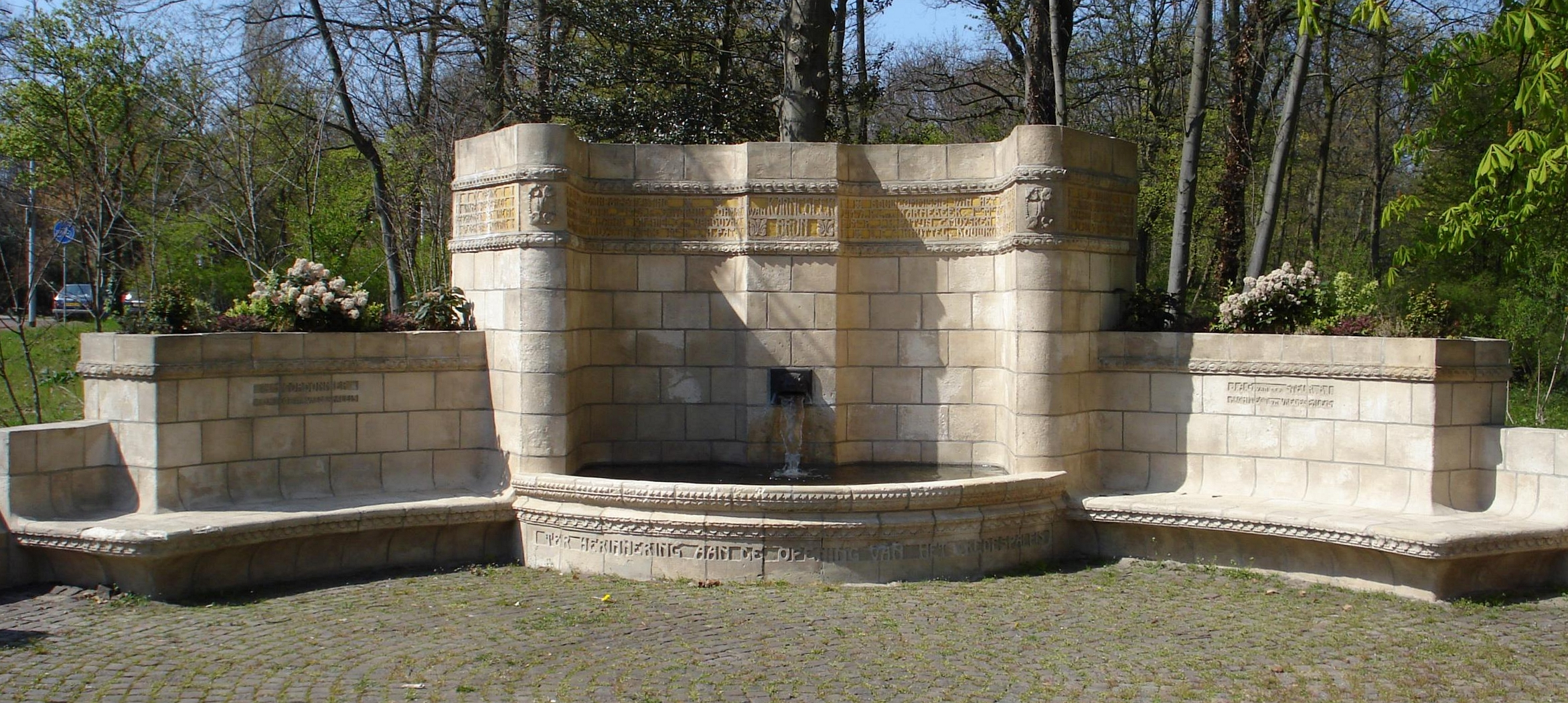
Van Karnebeekbron monument, The Hague.

Willem Coenraad Brouwer (19 October 1877, in Leiden – 23 May 1933, in Zoeterwoude) was a Dutch ceramist and sculptor.

== Life and work ==
Brouwer was a son of Nicholas Brouwer, head of a primary school in Leiden, and Antonia Coert. He studied at the Tekenschool ('Drawing school') in his hometown. From 1894 to 1898 he worked in the studio designing book ornamentation and letter cutting for his brother-in-law J.A. Loebèr. He then went to Gouda, where he became potter at the Goedewaagen ceramic factory. Around 1900 He joined the artists group 't Binnenhuis (the Interior). In 1901, Brouwer founded his own ceramic business in Leiderdorp under the name of Brouwer's Pottery Factory.

In 1906 he also made construction pottery and garden ceramics, for example he made the ceramics for the construction of the Peace Palace in The Hague. He is considered an innovator in this field. He collaborated with architects like Hendrik Petrus Berlage, Jacobus Oud, Willem Marinus Dudok and Jan Wils. He was a member of the Dutch Society of Sculptors.

In 1927 he published his autobiography which he started with the words:

If the following sentences will attempt to construct an image of the things experienced by me, it is almost without saying that this image will be incomplete. Indeed... the "experience" will undergo without pretense, later to serve as "source" for a historical accounting. Would we had known then, that "our time" would have had a very significant impact to... what we now call modern art, we had perhaps made more notes to help write pure history. However we will have to do with a story gleaned from memory."

== Works, a selection ==
- Sculpture (1909-1913) at the Peace Palace, The Hague.
- Ceramic sculpture (1912-1913) at the Kennemer Garage, Alkmaar.
- Ornaments (1914) for the church of Scharsterbrug.
- Van Karnebeekbron monument (1915), The Hague.
- Two monkeys with football with lace (1916), façade Sparta Stadion Het Kasteel, Rotterdam.
- Ornaments (1917) for building Leiden newspaper
- Caryatids (1917) for the Long House, Alkmaar
- Gijselaar Bank (1920), Rapenburg, Leiden
- Four fried stone ornaments (1923), depicting the Kasper my mind, up in the facade of the former headquarters Maurits mine, Geleen
- Facade Statues Hermes and Neptune (1928-1930) for Atlantic House, Rotterdam
- Five terracotta facade ornaments (1930) for the Wilhelmina Hospital, Assen

== Photo gallery ==
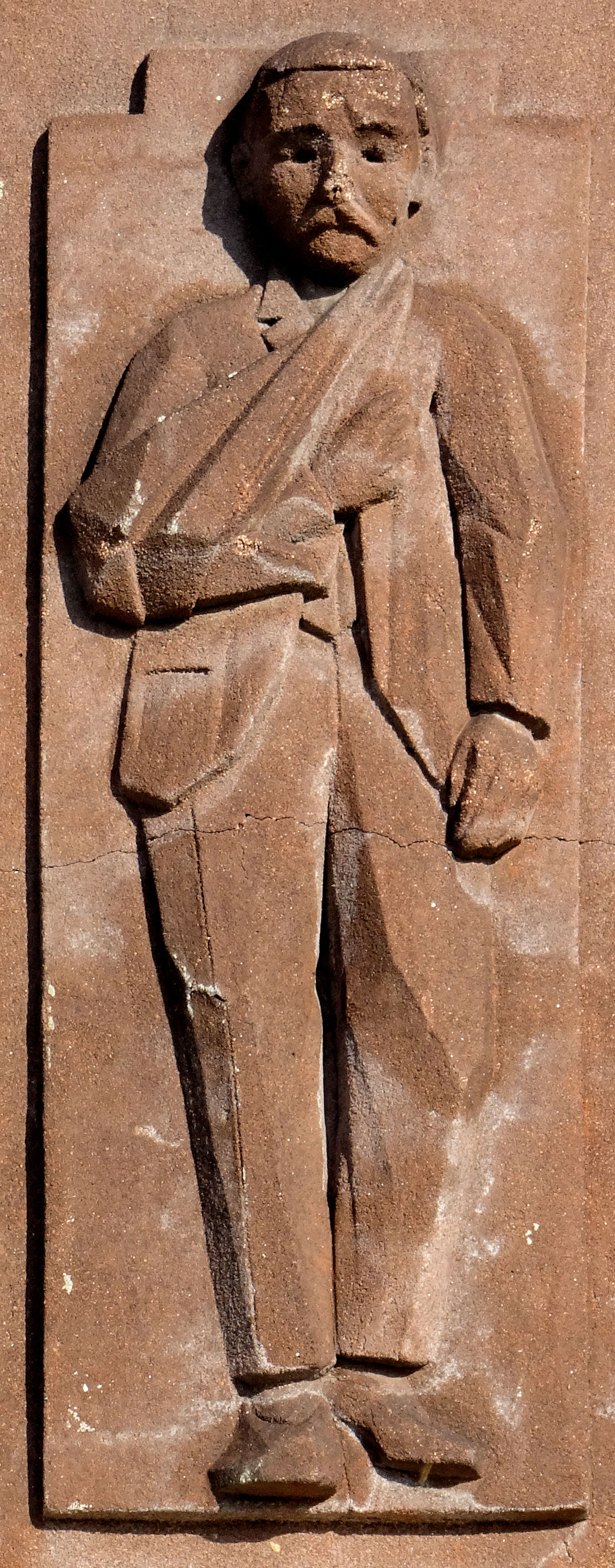
Patient (1930), Wilhelmina Hospital, Assen.

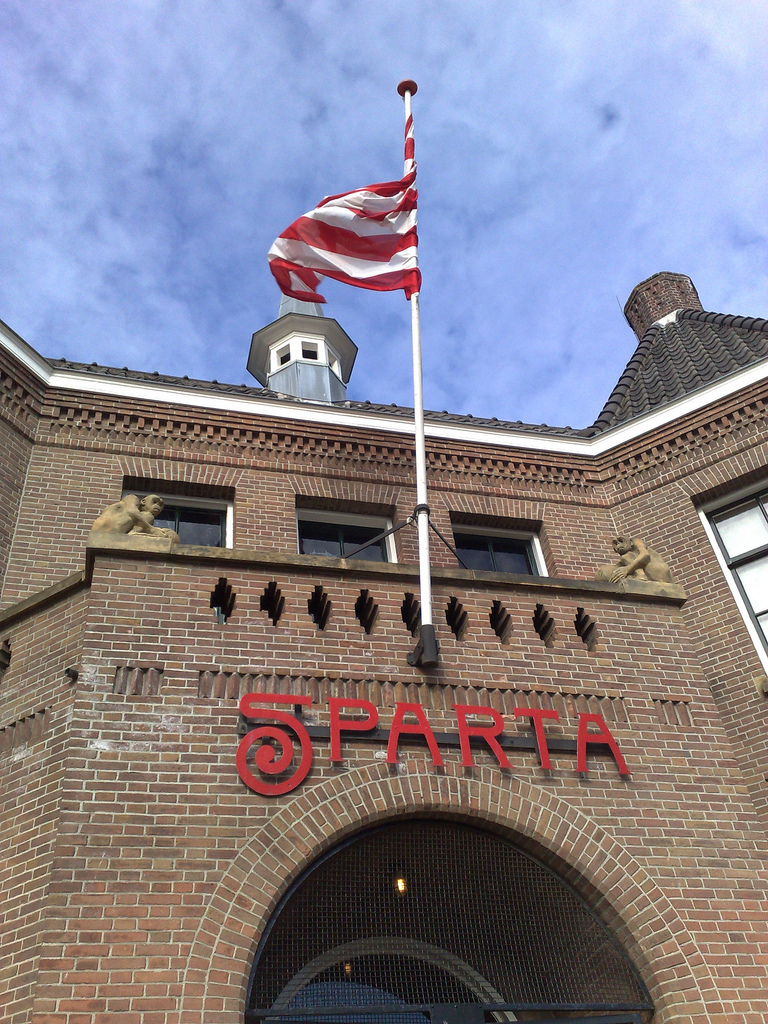
Two monkeys with football with lace (1916), façade Sparta Stadion Het Kasteel, Rotterdam.

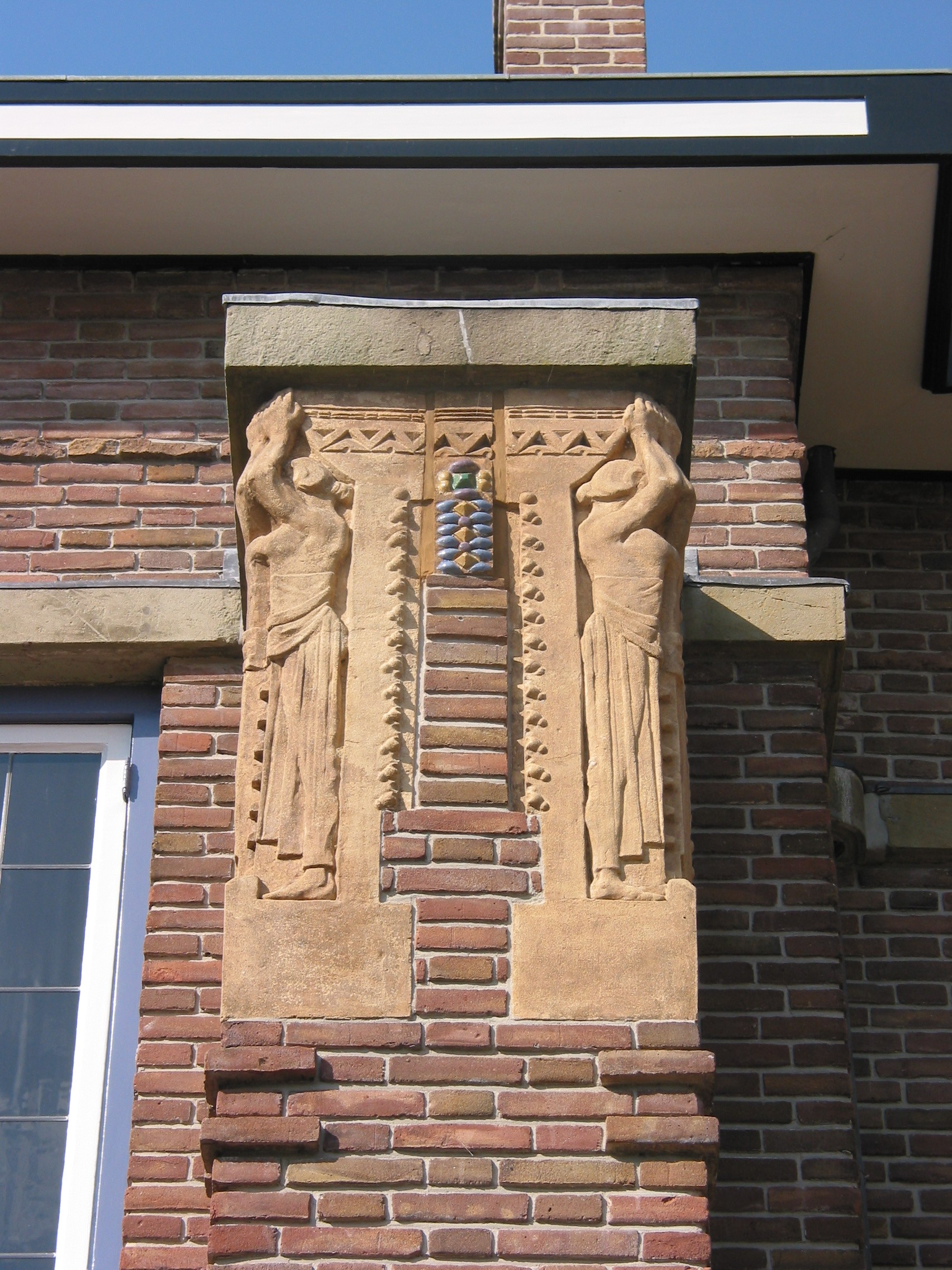
Caryatid Huis De Lange (1917), Alkmaar

== See also ==
- List of Dutch ceramists
