= Hannie Mein =

Dutch ceramist

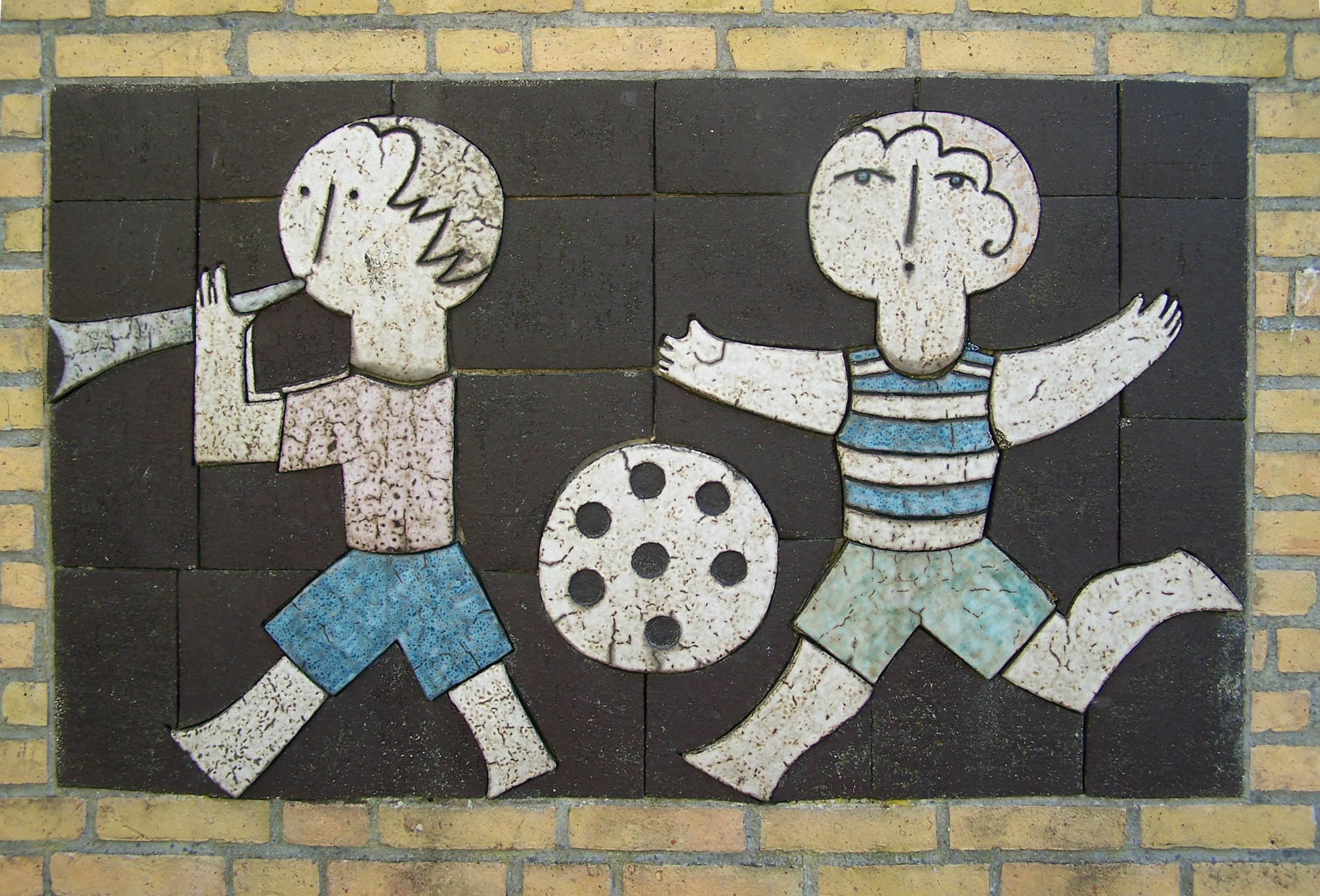
"Playing children," Leeuwarden.

Johanna Greta (Hannie) Mein (Utrecht, 10 July 1933 - Vinkega, 14 February 2003) was a Dutch ceramist.

== Life and work ==
After secondary school Mein started working at a potter. She attended evening classes at the Gerrit Rietveld Academy in Amsterdam, where she was taught by Theo Dobbelman and Emmy van Deventer. In Amsterdam she started her own studio together with Freek Noppen, whom she married in 1963. In 1969 the couple moved to the Frisian Vinkega. Mein had her studio and exhibition space in their farmhouse "the Bakehouse." Her husband took care of the business section. Mein produced much pottery, but also unique pieces. Her work has been recognized by the naive style, often with stylized animal figures.

In 1988 Mein was involved in the establishment of the Foundation Ceramists Northern Netherlands. In 2003 the ceramics gallery of the furniture boulevard in Wolvega was named after her. In the same year in the Nationaal Vlechtmuseum in Noordwolde held a retrospective of her work. The exhibition was organized by Mein herselves, but she did not lived to see the opening. She died a week before.

In 2005 the Hannie Mein Art Prize was instituted, for artists from Ooststellingwerf and Weststellingwerf, which that year was then presented to Guus Hellegers

== See also ==
- List of Dutch ceramists
