= Gerrit Patist =

Dutch sculptor and ceramist

Gerrit Patist (1947 – 2005, in De Bilt) was a Dutch sculptor and ceramist. Patist produced numerous works of art, primarily sculptures and ceramics, and also worked with brush and ink. He died at age 68 from leukemia.

== See also ==
- List of Dutch ceramists
