= Theo Colenbrander =

Dutch ceramist and designer (1841–1930)

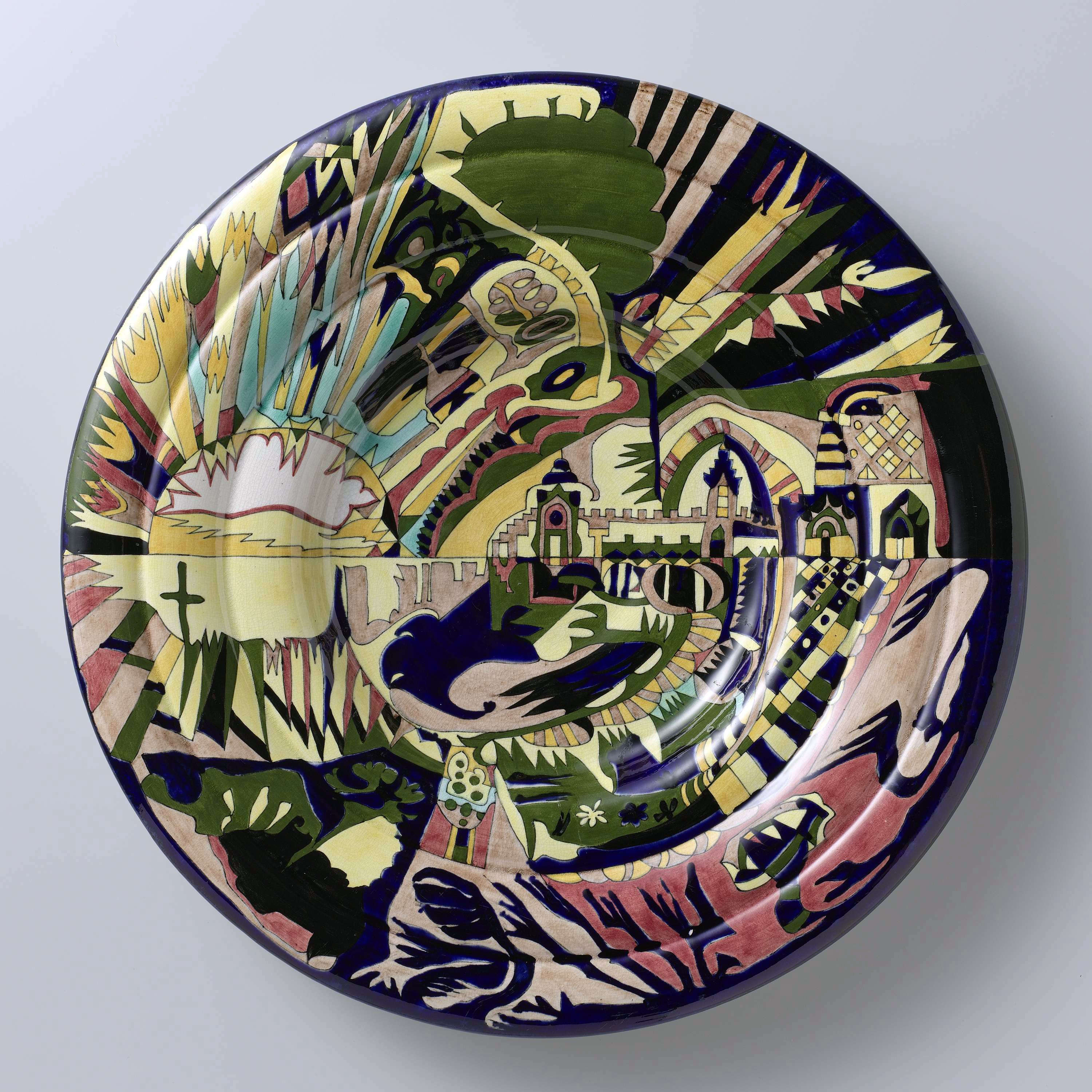
Plaque Constantinopel; Theo Colenbrander; 1886; Rozenburg Porselein

Theodoor Christiaan Adriaan (Theo) Colenbrander (31 October 1841 in Doesburg – 28 May 1930 in Laag-Keppel) was Dutch architect, ceramist plaque painter, and designer, characterized as the first Dutch industrial designer.

== Life and work ==
Colenbrander was born on 31 October 1841, in Doesburg, where his father was one of the notables, who worked as commissioner, insurance agent, land agent, and director of the potato flour mill. Beside his regular school, he received additional education from the local city architect. In the late 1850s, he started working for the architect L. H. Eberson (1822–1889) in Arnhem, who later became the chief architect for Willem III. He participated in some architectural contests by the Maatschappij tot Bevordering der Bouwkunst, and received some honorable recommendations. In 1867, he moved to Paris where he assisted in the construction of the Dutch pavilion for the World Fair in Paris of 1867.

Back in the Netherlands he settled in The Hague. From 1884 to 1888, he was designer and artistic director at the plaque factory Plateelbakkerij Rozenburg in The Hague. The Gemeentemuseum Den Haag recalls, that "Rozenburg pottery made a particularly important contribution to the transformation of Dutch decorative earthenware. This was due first and foremost to the architect T. A. C. Colenbrander (1841–1930), who designed a completely new and innovative range over the 1885 to 1889 period. His striking designs featured distinctively irregular shapes and fanciful decorative motifs, generally abstracted from nature and executed in an Expressionist palette."

As designer he subsequently worked in Deventer, Amersfoort, The Hague in the year 1912–13, Oosterbeek (Renkum), and since the 1920s in Arnhem. From 1921 to 1924, he designed work for the Plateelbakkerij Ram, which only produced designs by Colenbrander.

== Gallery ==
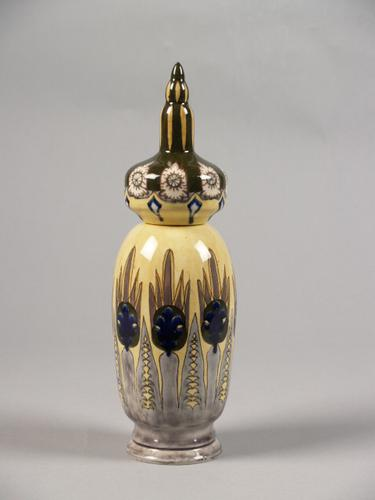
Vase with cover with abstract floral decor, 1888–89

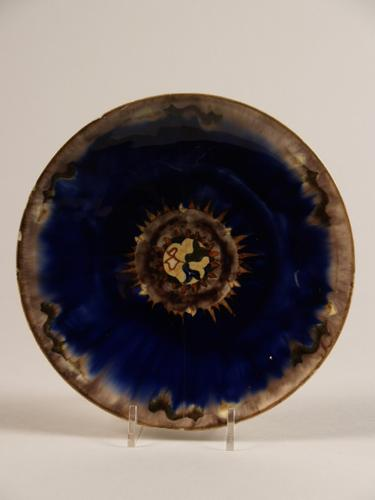
Plate with abstract decor, 1889

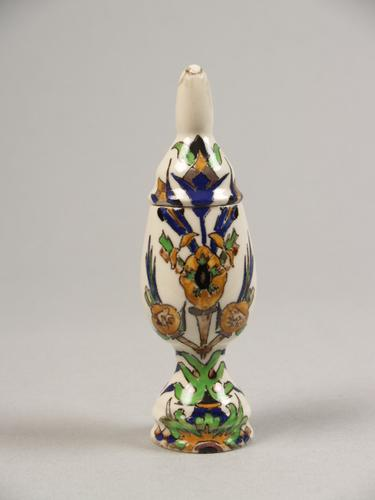
Pot with cover with abstract floral decor, 1890

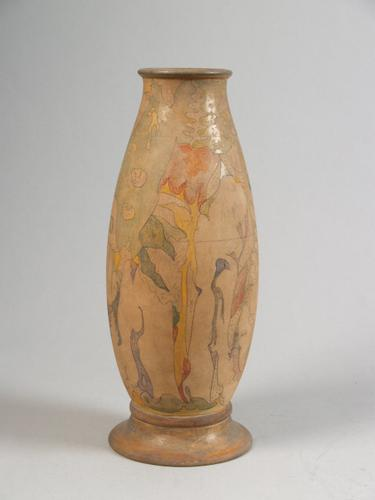
Vase model 3 with abstract decor, 1921

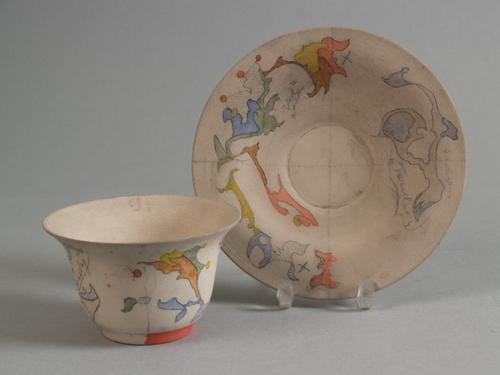
Cup and saucer with abstract decor, 1921–24

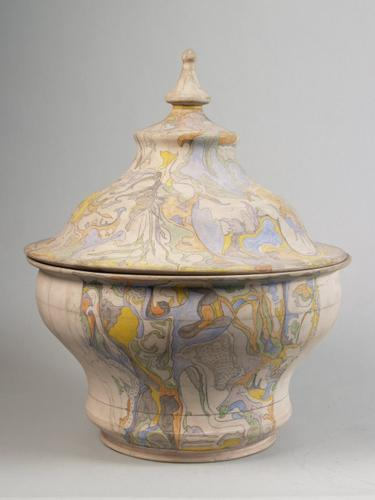
Pot with cover model 49 with abstract floral decor, 1924

== Work in public collections (selection) ==
- Rijksmuseum Amsterdam
- Princessehof Ceramics Museum
- Museum de Fundatie, Zwolle

== See also ==
- List of Dutch ceramists
