= Lia van Rhijn =

Dutch artist

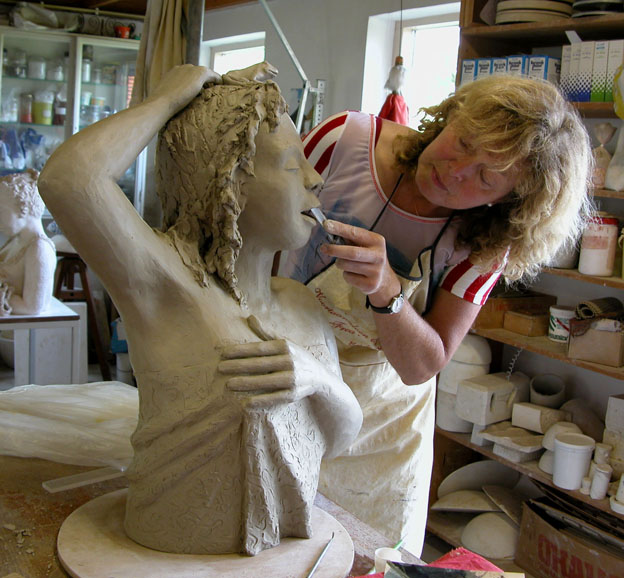
Van Rhijn with "Singer" sculpture.

Lia van Rhijn (born 1953 in Nieuwerkerk aan den IJssel) is a Dutch ceramist and sculptor, who makes sculptures of human – and animal figures and architectural forms.

== Life ==
Lia van Rhijn studied at the Academy of Fine Arts in Amersfoort and the Free Academy in The Hague. It was Ernst Beijer who awoke her interest for special architectural lines, and she received glaze lessons from Henk Trumpie.

For her early work she received the Art Encouragement Prize from the city of Gouda in 1980. Travelling to Mexico, Ireland, Spain and imaginary tours to Cappadocia made her aware of the ethnic and geographic influence on art forms. In these experiences she found the themes and inspiration for all her work. In addition, she is not led by conventional currents, but follows her own ideas.

The studio of Lia van Rhijn is part of the Arts Centre Hofstede Duet in Zuidwolde, Drenthe in which her life partner, the etcher Han van Hagen, participates. In that context, they offers courses and workshops.

== Work ==
The raw material for Lia van Rhijn's work is clay, which produced both turned work and hand sculpture; Also, the clay mold press is used. The baking and glazing of the images is carried out according to various techniques and in various ovens, including the Raku method. Her images include human – and animal figures, with attention to moods and attitudes. Part of her portraits are inspired by examples from the Renaissance.

Architectural forms, as well as draperies find a place in her oeuvre. Combinations of themes occur. Her pots and bowls are purely artistic, but could also be partly named artistic formed using ceramic or ceramic applied.

== Gallery ==
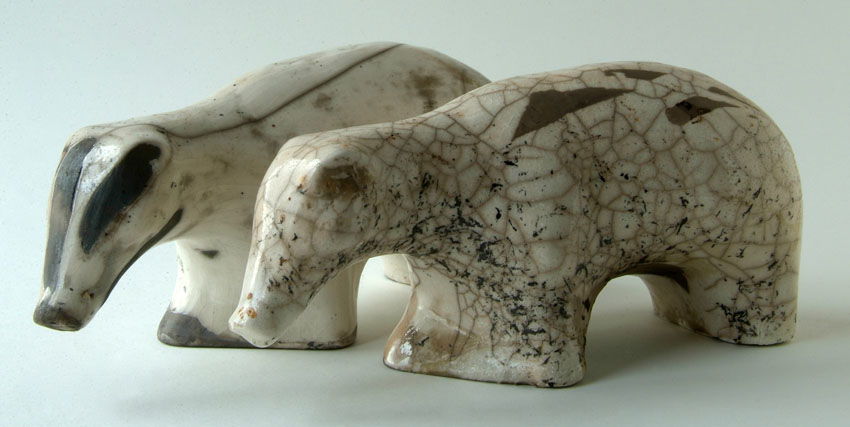
Necktie

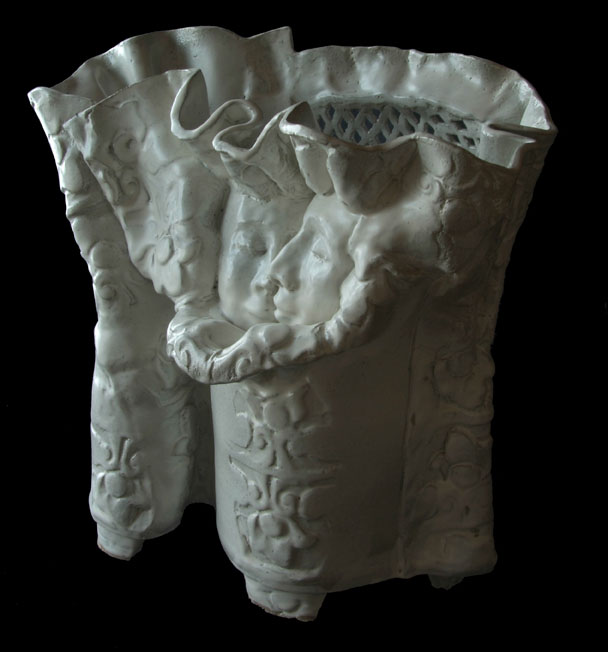
Drapery

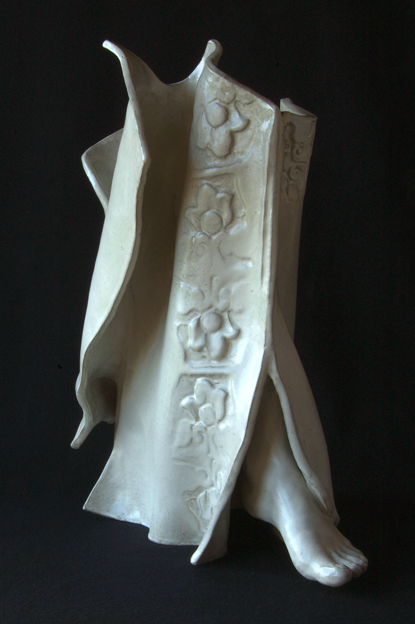
Drapery with foot

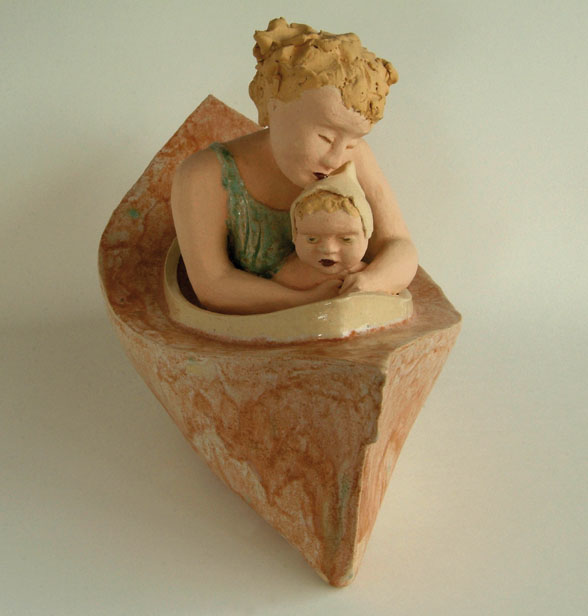
Mother and Child

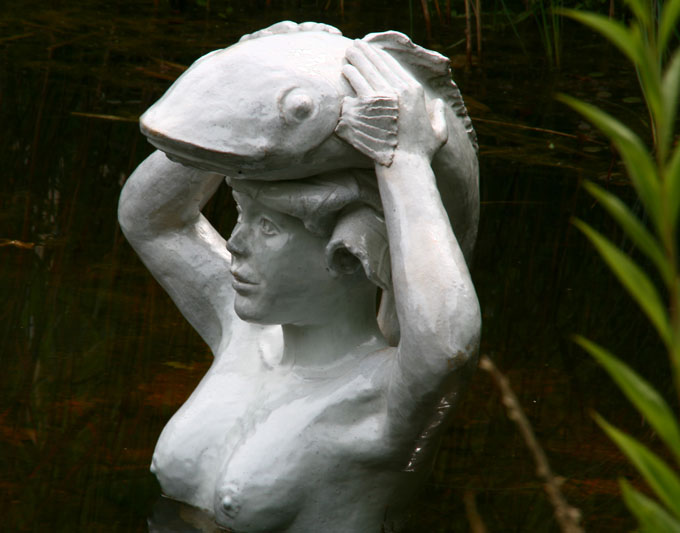
Mermaid

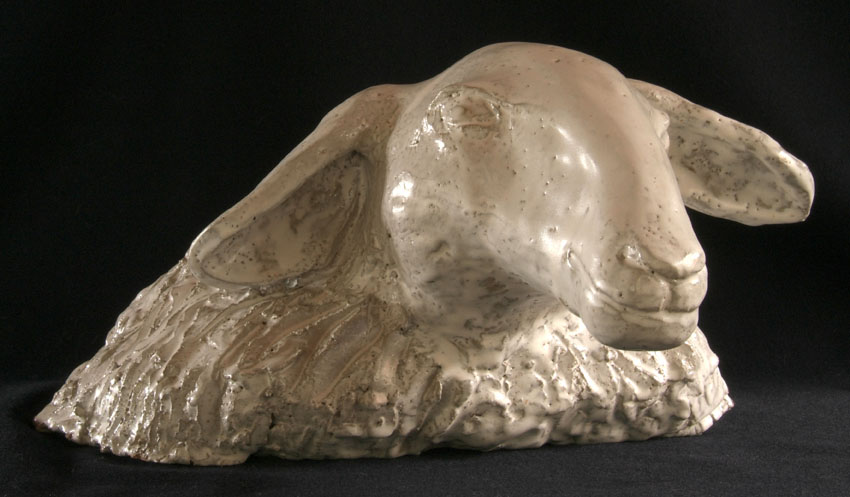
Sheep

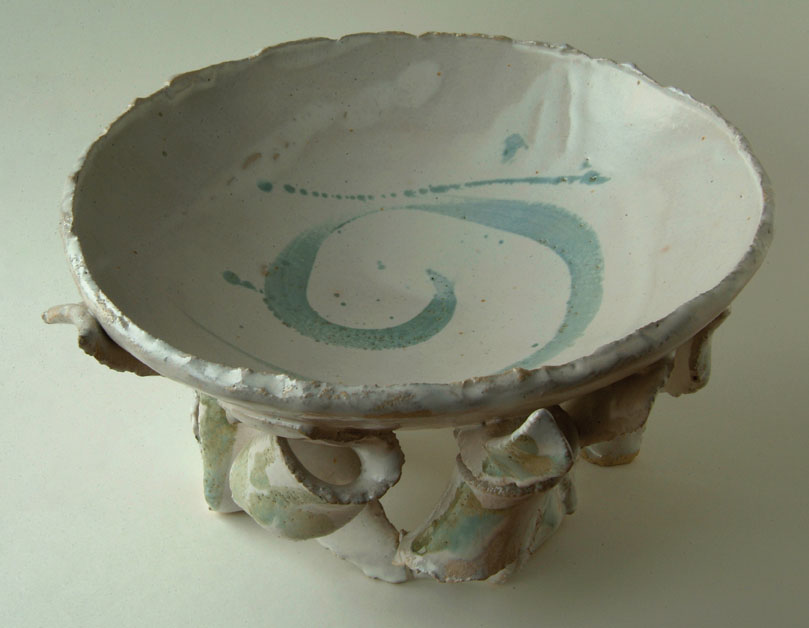
Shell

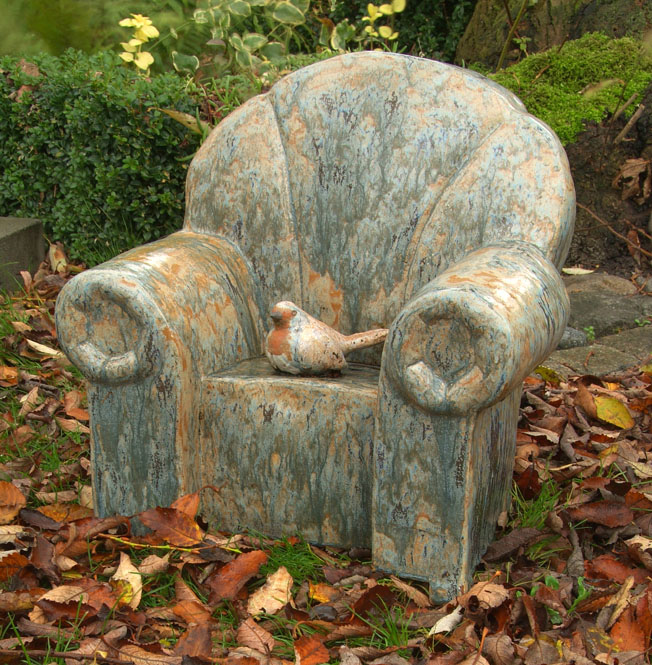
Robin

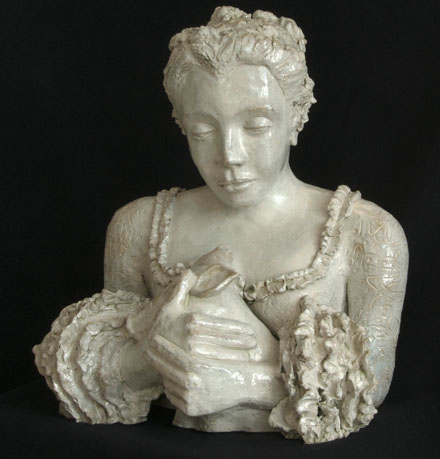
Marie Antoinette

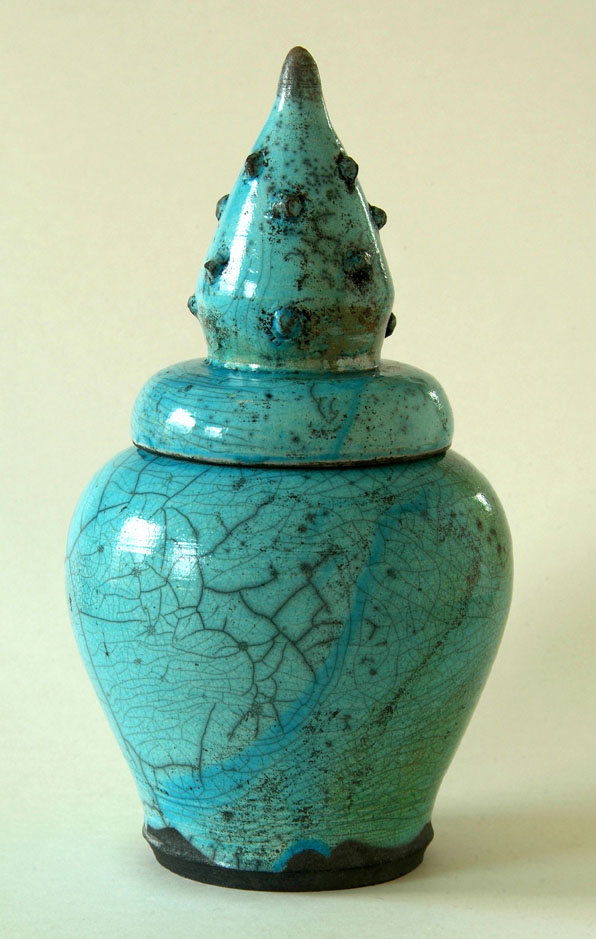
Tower Vase

== See also ==
- List of Dutch ceramists
