= Jan van Stolk =

Dutch ceramist

- Born: 11 March 1920; Santa Brigida
- Died: 20 December 1997 (aged 77); Oosterbeek
- Occupation: Ceramist, sculptor

Jan van Stolk (March 11, 1920 in Santa Brigida – December 20, 1997 in Oosterbeek) was a Dutch ceramist.

== Life and work ==
Van Stolk was the son of Pieter Adriaan van Stolk and Sophie van der Does de Willebois. He was born in the Canary Islands and later lived with his parents in Italy, the Netherlands and Greece. In the 1930, he moved back to the Netherlands with his mother and stepfather Luigi de Lerma. They were both potters and started a studio in Utrecht Groenekan. Van Stolk participated in their workshops. During World War II, he studied at the Art Academy in Arnhem under Gijs Jacobs van den Hof.

In 1946, Van Stolk opened his own studios in Nijmegen, and from 1953 in Oosterbeek. Until 1970, he was a lecturer at the Free Academy in Nijmegen. He had several students and assistants, such as Wim Fiege and Marianna Franken. In the early work of Van Stolk the Mediterranean atmosphere is recognizable. Later he was working with engraved decorations, often on a black background. Since the 1960s he also made ceramic sculptures.

== See also ==
- List of Dutch ceramists
