= Aalmis =

Dutch painter

Jan Aalmis or Johannes Aelmis (bapt. 4 April 1674, Rotterdam – bur. 2 April 1755, Rotterdam) was a painter on faience.

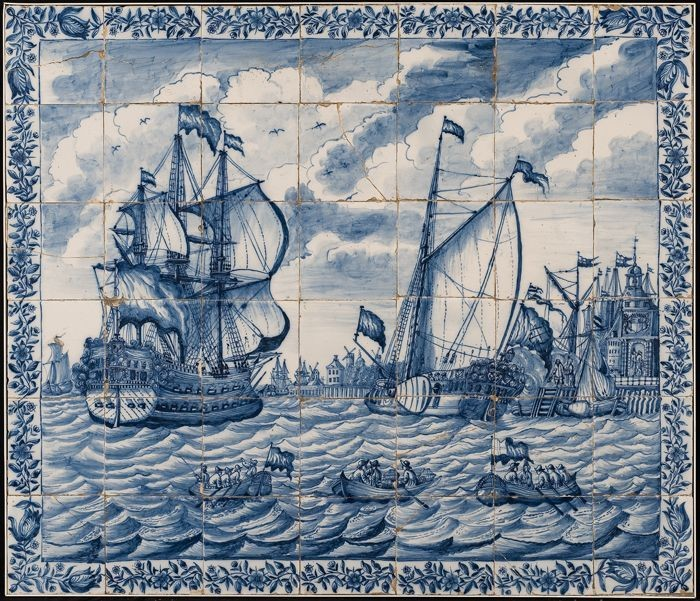
Tile tableau showing the departure in 1688 of Prince William III from Rotterdam to England on board the Den Briel

He long worked for Cornelis de Berg of Delft. Pieces bearing his name, together with the mark of Cornelis de Berg, are dated 1731, and consist of figure subjects, often in blue, but occasionally in polychrome. He was the father of the painter, draftsman, and tile painter Jan Aelmis (II) (1714–1799) and the painter and draftsman Johan Bartolomeus Aelmis (1723–1786). The signed pieces can therefore also be those of his elder son.
