= Chris Dagradi =

American artist

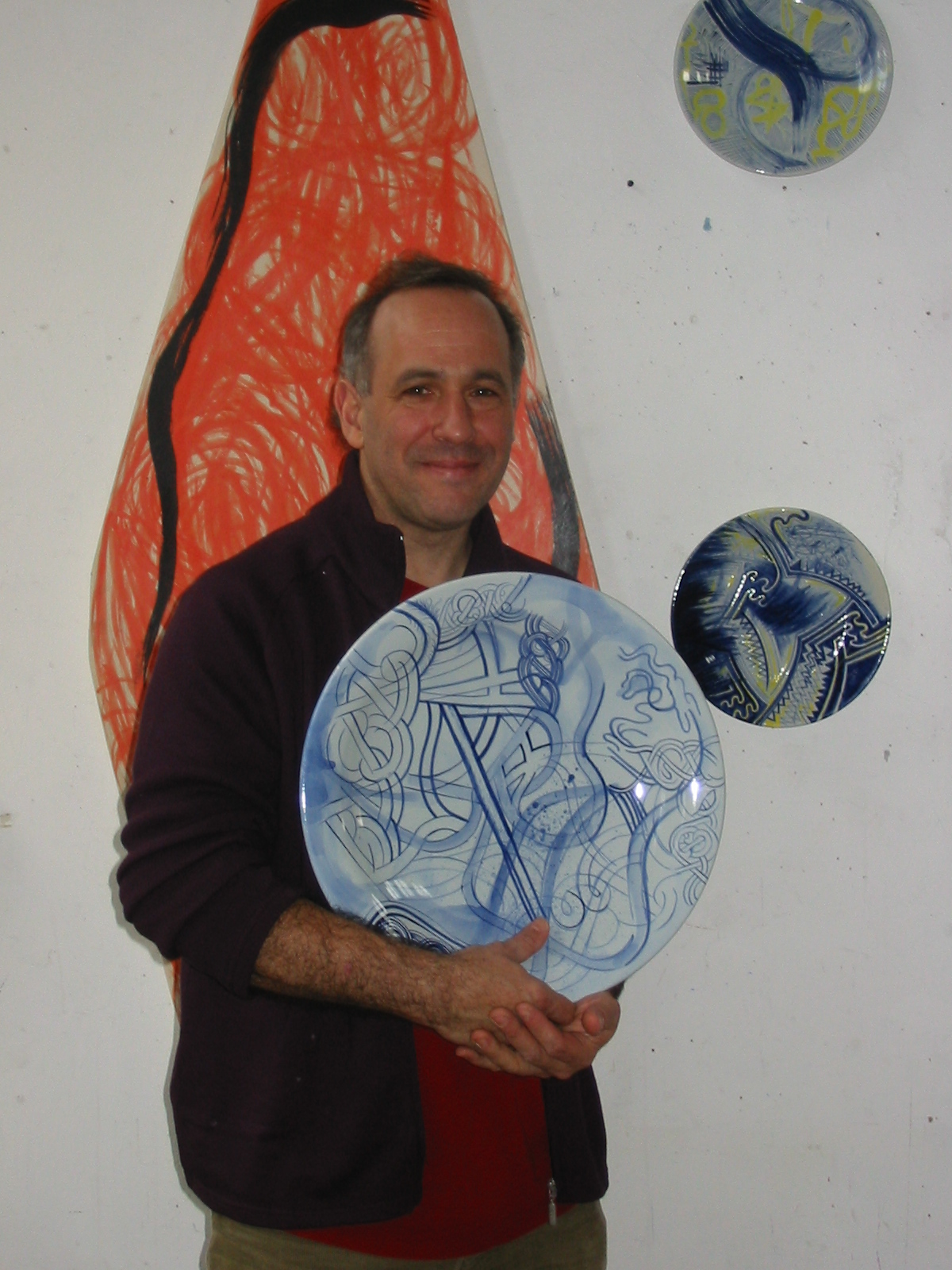
Chris Dagradi in Delft, 2006.

Chris Dagradi (born August 21, 1954 in New York) is an American artist, who lives and works in the Netherlands since 1978. He works as painter, sculptor and ceramist.

== Life and work ==
Dagradi studied at the Cooper Union in New York City from 1974 to 1977, at the Willem de Kooning Academy in Rotterdam and at Ateliers '63 in Haarlem.

Originally Dagradi worked in abstract expressionist style. His paintings contain strong lines and colors, the layering and depth noticeable. In the 1990s, he settled in Delft, where he found an ancient shard of pottery. Ever since, he is fascinated by the Delftware and the possibilities offered by the painting of tiles and ceramics, and makes plates, tile panels, mosaic, and tiles with relief. He got experience with this technique through his work as a painter at the Delft Pauw and as a production assistant at Royal Delft.

Dagradi exhibited among other in the Museum Het Prinsenhof in Delft and the Dutch Tile Museum in Otterlo. For the Delft district Wippolder Dagradi made a tableau with the map of the district.

== Gallery ==
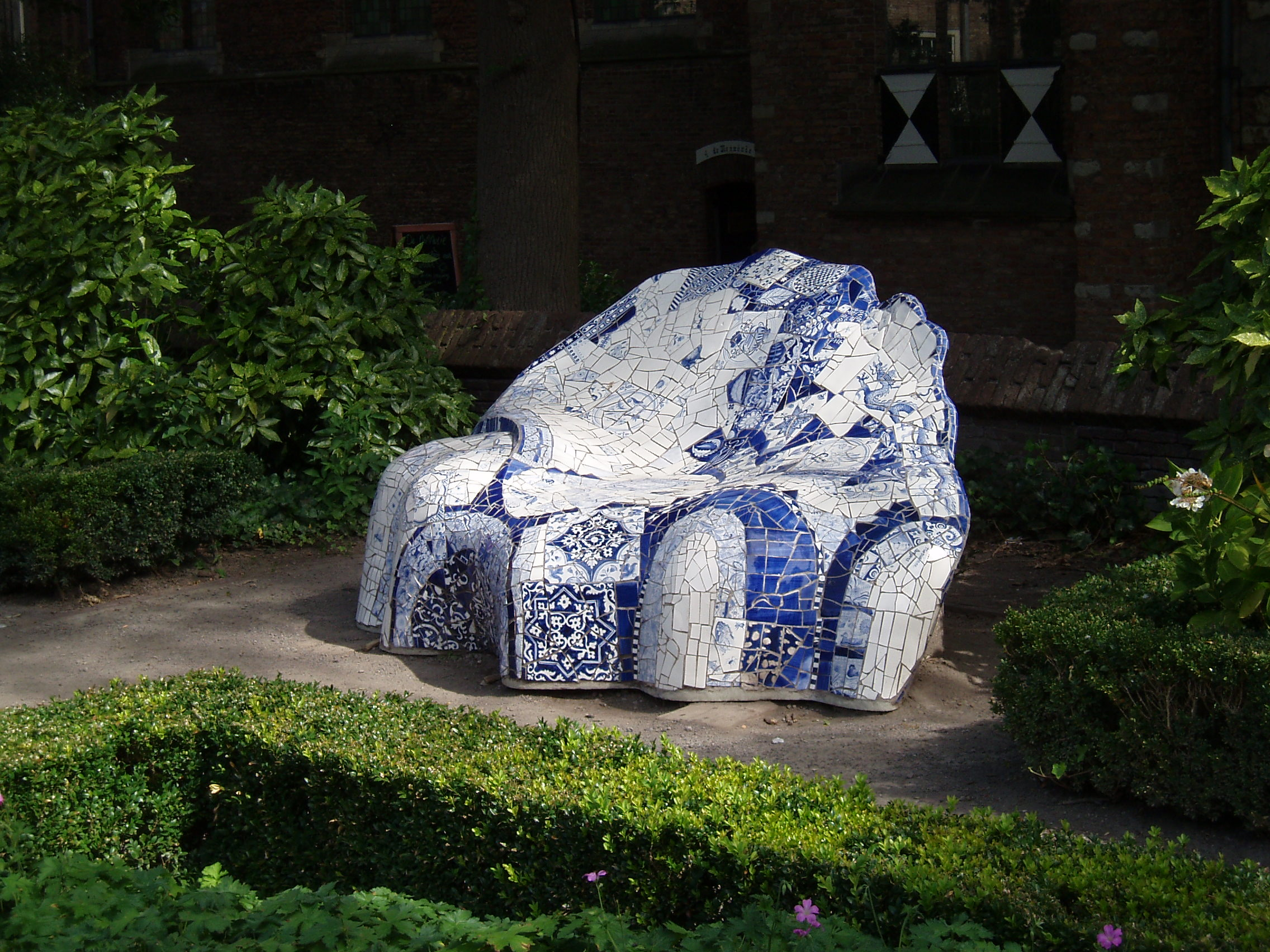
Hommage aan Gaudi, Delft 1988

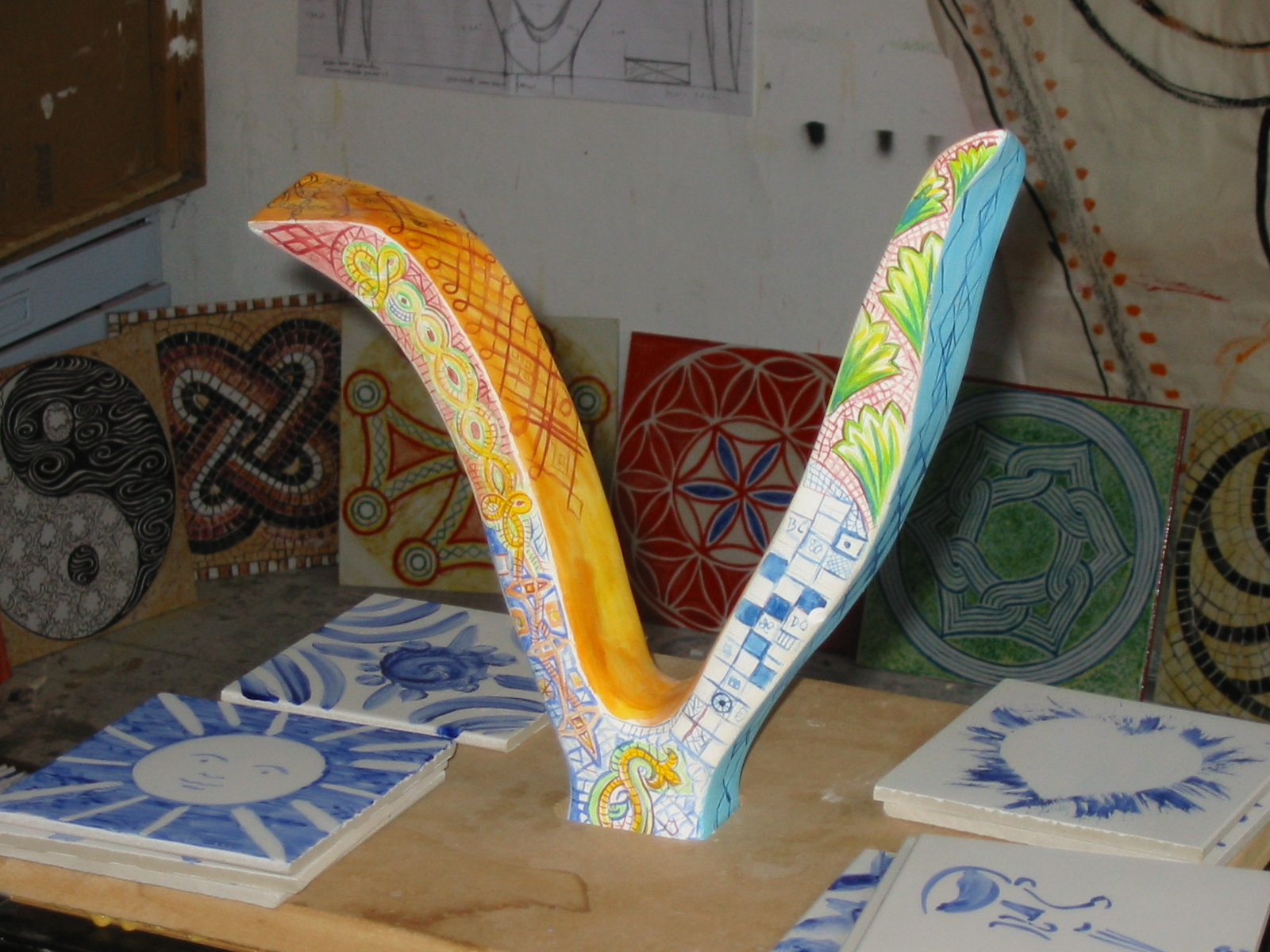
Model of V for sculpture in Delft, 2006.

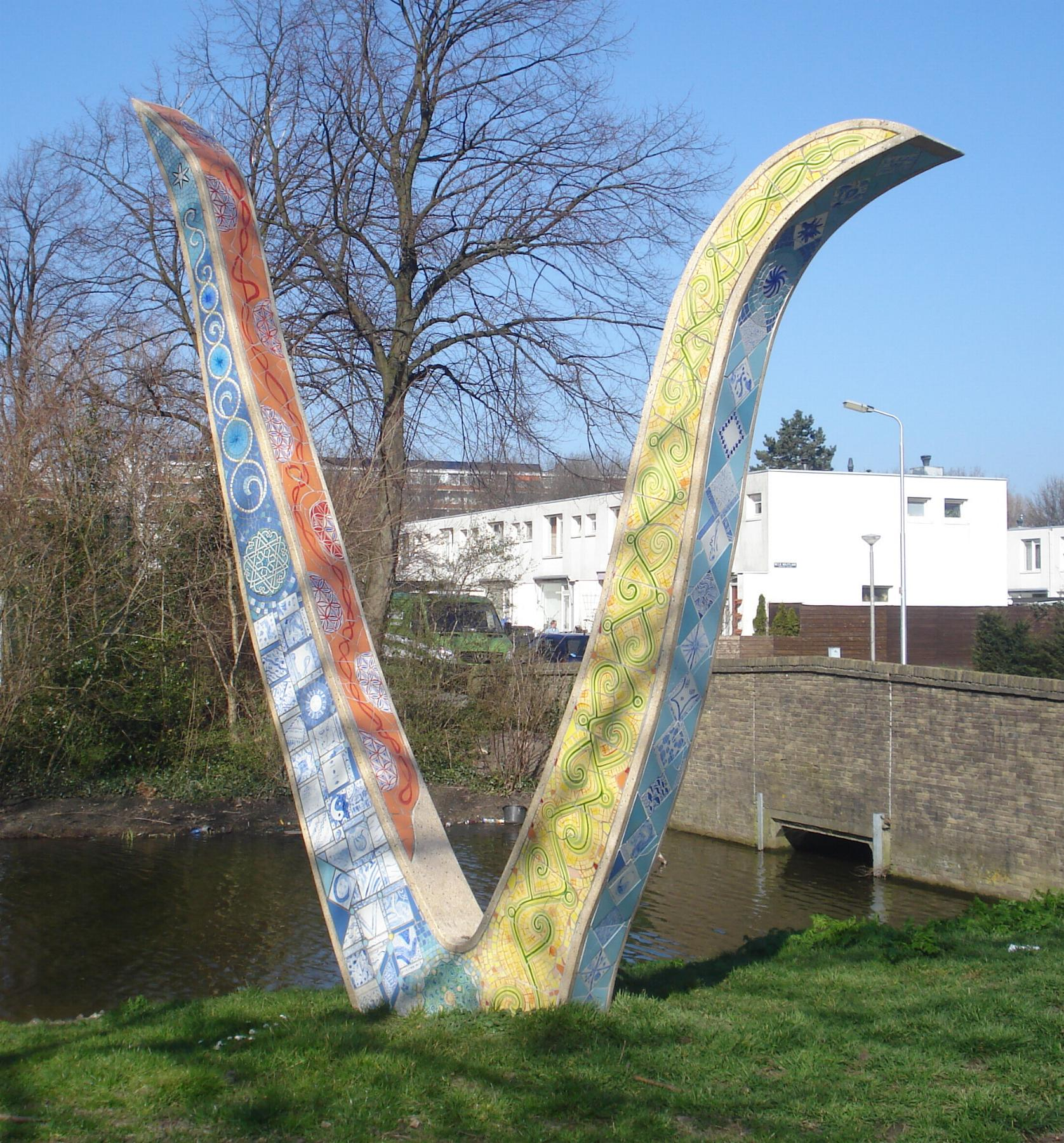
V sculpture, Delft 2007

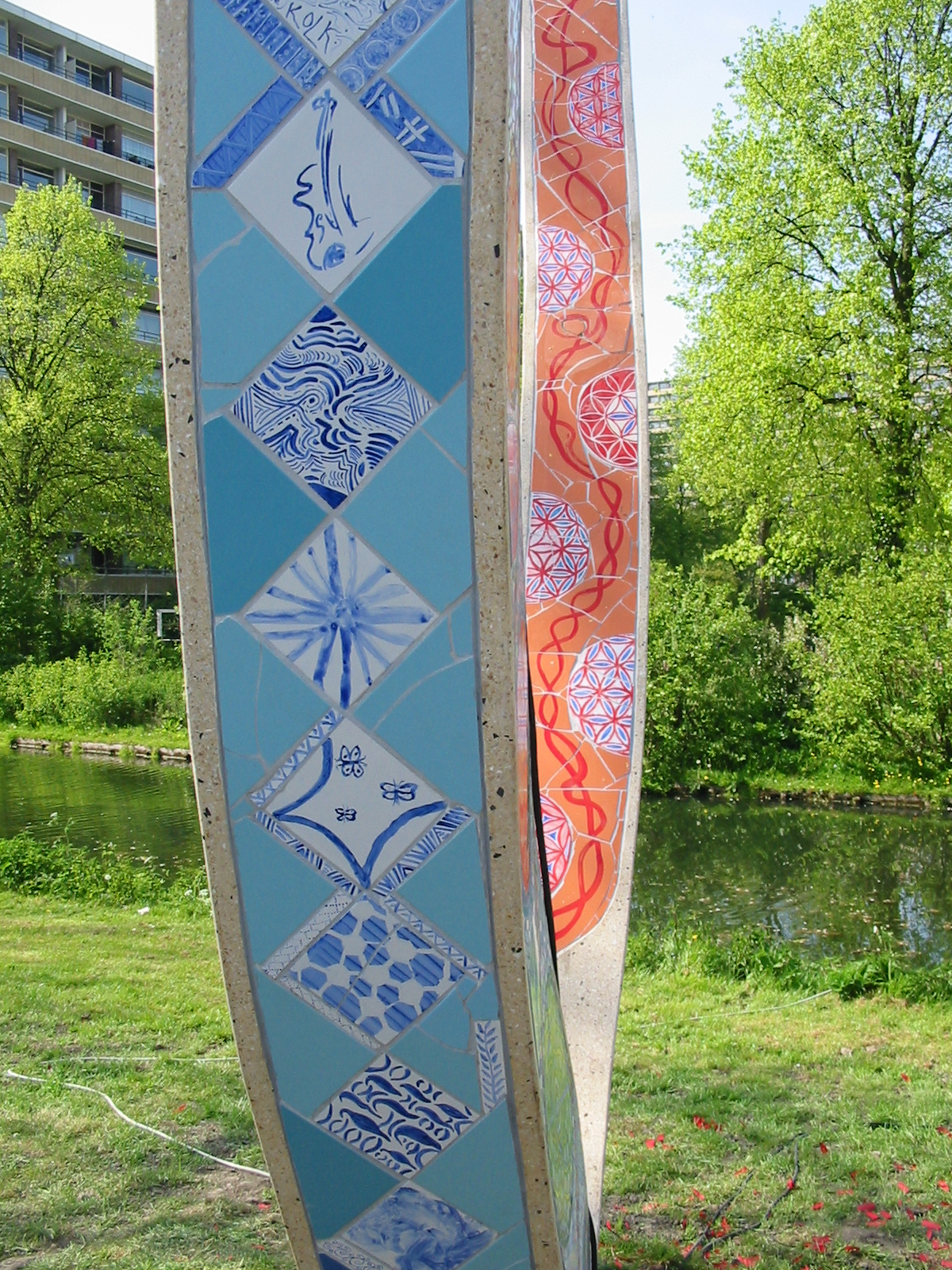
V sculpture, Delft 2007 (detail)

== See also ==
- List of Dutch ceramists
