= Wietske van Leeuwen =

Dutch ceramist (born 1965)

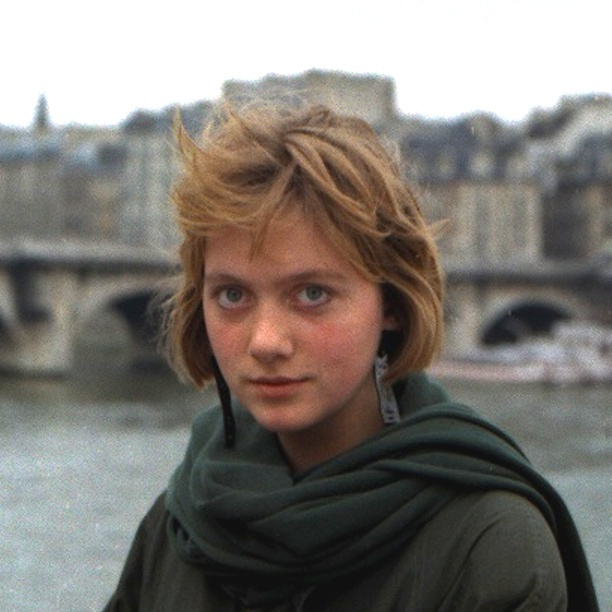
- Wietske van Leeuwen in Paris, 1987.
- Born: 22 September 1965 (age 61); Rotterdam, Netherlands
- Education: Gerrit Rietveld Academy
- Known for: Ceramics
- Awards: Nominee NPS Cultuurprijs 1996
- Website: wietskevanleeuwen.nl

Wietske van Leeuwen (born 22 September 1965 in Rotterdam) is a Dutch ceramist, who lives and works in Monnickendam. Her works are constructed in a baroque style, with shells and fruit as recurring motifs.

== Biography ==
Born in Rotterdam to Sjoerd and Marianne van Leeuwen, Van Leeuwen grew up in Mijnsheerenland. Her father ran a timber trading company in Overschie, and her uncle is the photographer Piet van Leeuwen (born 1942). She studied handicrafts and textile art at the teacher training college in Delft from 1984 to 1989, and ceramic design at the Gerrit Rietveld Academy in Amsterdam from 1989 to 1993 under Jan van der Vaart, and Henk Trumpie.

After graduation she settled in Amsterdam as an independent artist and started her own studio. In 1996, Van Leeuwen was nominated by Thimo te Duits for the NPS Cultuurprijs 1996, a competition between young unknown artists which was aired on national television.

Van Leeuwen received a number of grants from the Mondriaan Fonds, the Dutch fund for visual art and cultural heritage. Since 1997, she has been a ceramics and drawing teacher at Altra College in Amsterdam.

== Work ==
Since her early work in the 1990s, Van Leeuwen has been fascinated by 17th century still lifes and cabinet of curiosities, which she translated into her work. Her pots, vases, and candle holders are constructed with shapes of seashells, nuts or lemons consequently composing. Some of the pots held a kitchy image on the bottom. Those earlier works of art suggested an underwater world. It wanted to present itself as something precious, as if it were a treasure found at the bottom of the deep sea.

=== Photo Gallery ===
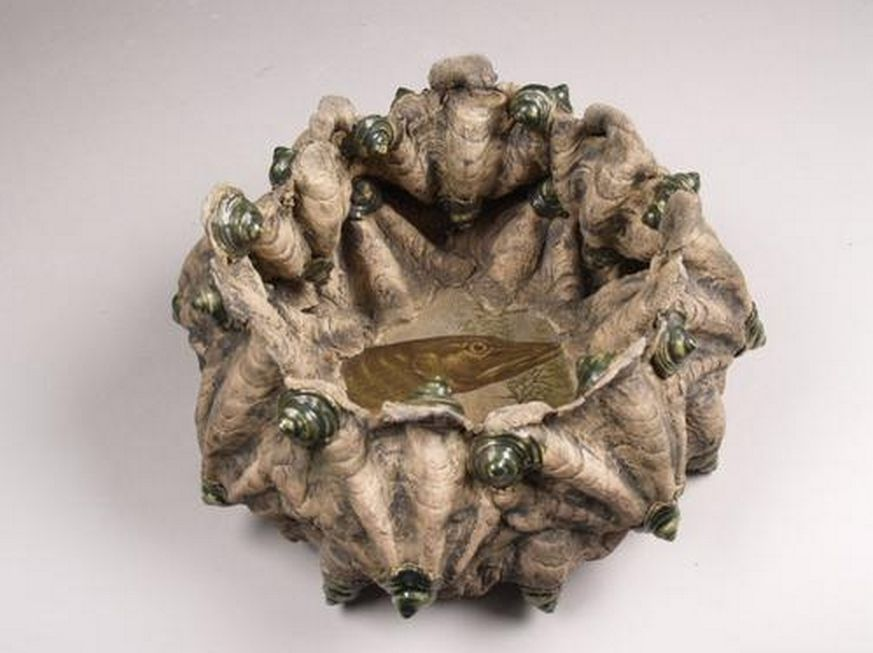
Shell bowl with deepsea pike, 1993

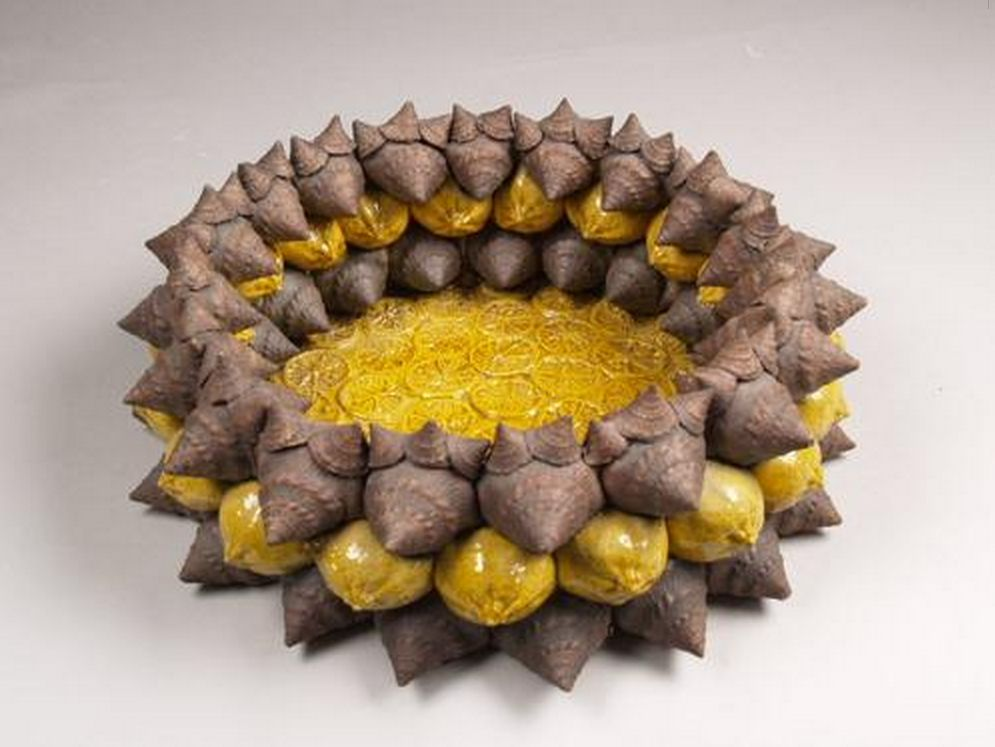
Scale with matt brown side, 1995

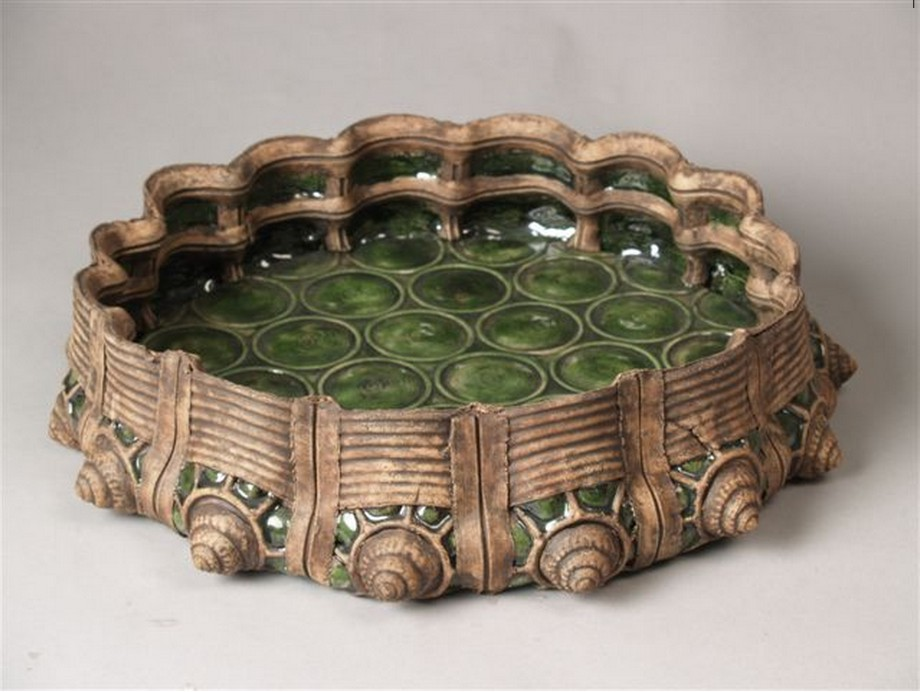
Green glass bowl, 1997

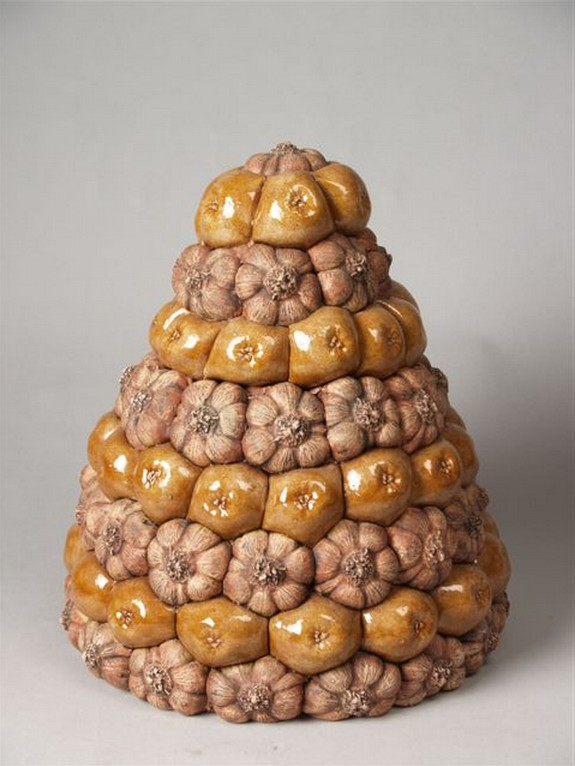
Terrine with lid, 1997

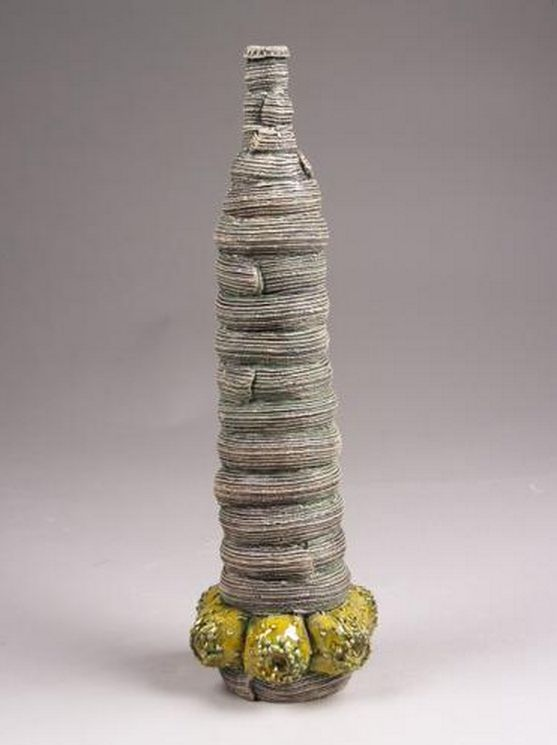
Vase with cactus fruits, 2000

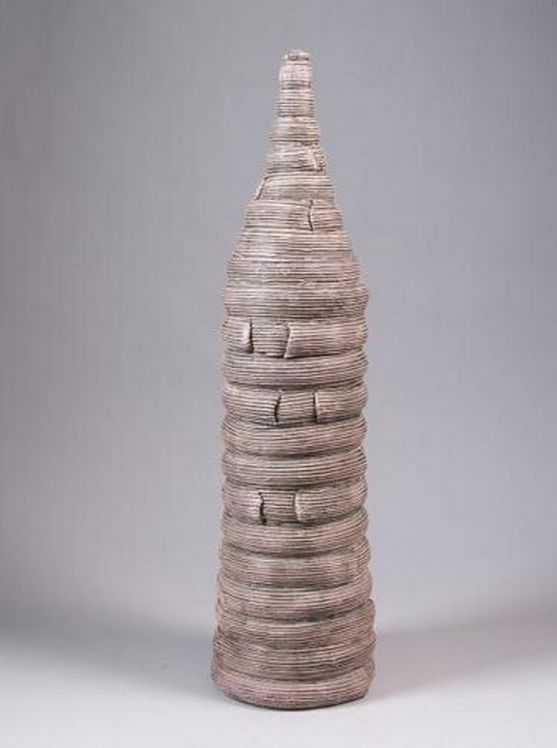
Bear claw pot, 2007

Van Leeuwen's work is included in the collection of the Gemeentemuseum Den Haag, the Museum Boijmans Van Beuningen in Rotterdam, and the Princessehof Ceramics Museum.

=== Exhibitions, a selection ===
- 1993. Vijf afgestudeerden van de Rietveld-academie. Gallery Inart Amsterdam.
- 1994. Wietske van Leeuwen and Heike Suhre, gallery Sio2 in Maastricht.
- 1994-95. Marian Beek, Edzard Krol en Dirk Beintema: olieverf en Wietske van Leeuwen: keramiek, Galerie de Vis, Harlingen.
- 1995. Gallery Inart, Prinsengracht 510, Amsterdam.
- 1996. 10 jaar galerie Terra, Gallery Terra, Delft.
- 1997. Nancy Margolis Gallery, New York City, USA
- 2010. KLEIKUNST, STEENGOED! Keramiek uit Museum Boijmans Van Beuningen, Kunsthal, Rotterdam.
- 2014. Biennale internationale de céramique d'art, in Vallauris, France.
- 2015. KunstRAI, Galerie Carla Koch, Amsterdam.
- 2015. Clay! A Century of Ceramics at the Gerrit Rietveld Academie, Gemeentemuseum, Den Haag, 2015.

In the 2010 exhibit in the Kunsthal, a selection of the modern ceramic art collection of Museum Boijmans Van Beuningen was shown with works of multiple generations of Dutch ceramists. Works were shown from the beginning of the 20th century with Chris Lanooij (1881-1948) and Hein Andrée (1882-1961) and from more contemporary artists as Johan van Loon (1934), Jan van der Vaart (1931-2000), Barbara Nanning (1957), Geert Lap, and Olaf Stevens. The works of Esther Stasse and Wietske van Leeuwen were their representation of the last generation.

== Reception ==
At the Studio Pottery website, the Dutch Galery Carla Koch (2008) gave the following description of the motives in the work and motivation behind the work:

Van Leeuwen creates strikingly baroque objects, made up of many small prints of shells and fruit, which remind of the curio cabinets that were in fashion in the 17th century and admired by her. It was in vogue among the wealthy merchants of that era to collect new types of fruit and shells that were brought back by the VOC ships, in such cabinets. Van Leeuwen uses shells and fruit to make plaster press moulds, which are then used for producing large quantities of prints. From these prints she creates her objects, always using the pot or dish shape as a basis. Her objects are flawless both on the inside and outside, a ceramic tour de force. She uses dishes and pots with lids as her base shapes. In addition, she creates combinations of ceramic "garnitures", which were also common during the 17th century."

== See also ==
- List of Dutch ceramists
