= Van Deventer =

van Deventer may refer to:

== People ==
van Deventer is a surname of Dutch origin. It is sometimes written as Van Deventer, Vandeventer or VanDeventer. Notable people with the name include:

- Algernon Foster van Deventer (1862–1931), American politician
- Andre van Deventer (born 1930), South African Army officer and politician
- Anelle van Deventer (born 1993), South African field hockey player
- Conrad Theodor van Deventer (1857–1915), Dutch lawyer, author, and politician
- Denise van Deventer (born 1990), Dutch international cricketer
- Emmy van Deventer (1915–1998), Dutch ceramist
- Gesie van Deventer (born 1958), South African politician, farmer and advocate
- Jacob van Deventer (cartographer) (c. 1500–1575), Dutch cartographer of the Renaissance
- Jacob van Deventer (general) (1874–1922), South African military commander
- John H. Van Deventer (1881–1956), American engineering writer
- Juan van Deventer (born 1983), South African Olympic distance runner
- Just van Deventer (1906–1957), Dutch ceramist
- Kobus Van Deventer, South African rugby player
- Oskar van Deventer (born 1965), Dutch puzzlemaker

== Animals ==
- VanDeventer's rock gecko, (Cnemaspis vandeventeri), a species of gecko endemic to central Thailand, named after biologist Ryan J. VanDeventer

== Other uses ==
- Vandeventer, St. Louis, a neighborhood of St. Louis, Missouri
- Vandeventer Flat, a flat in Riverside County, California

== See also ==
- Van Devanter
