= Nanning (disambiguation) =

Nanning is the capital of Guangxi Zhuang Autonomous Region, China.

Nanning can also refer to:

- Nanning Railway Station
- Nanning Wuxu International Airport
- Barbara Nanning (born 1957), Dutch artist

== See also ==
- Nanningosaurus, a dinosaur genus
