= Emmy van Deventer =

Dutch ceramist

Emmy van Deventer-Molt (2 February 1915, in Voorburg – 1998) was a Dutch ceramist, and lecturer at the Gerrit Rietveld Academie, and the AKV St. Joost.

== Life and work ==
Born Emmy Molt in Voorburg, Emmy at the age of 4 moved to Leiden where she grew up. She attended the Hogere Burgerschool for girls in Leiden, where she graduated with honor. In 1936 she married the ceramist Just van Deventer and move to Amsterdam. In 1939 she started a medicine study at the University of Amsterdam in 1939, which she had to break up in the war.

In the early 1950s she started the experiment with glaze in the studio of Just van Deventer, and in 1955 starts working at the De Porceleyne Fles in Delft. After the dead of Just van Deventer in 1957, she also starts to lecture at the AKV St. Joost in his place. From 1971 to 1980 she also lecture at the Gerrit Rietveld Academie beside Jan van der Vaart, and get succeeded by Henk Trumpie. After her retirement in 1980 she moved to Assen, where she continued to lecture at the Academie Minerva in Groningen.

Among her students were Dick Bouman, Henk Dil, Marianna Franken, Pieter Geraedts (born 1940), Vilma Henkelman, Lily ter Kuile, Sonja Landweer, Hannie Mein, Beatrijs Nietzsche-Chavannes, Ab Schouten, Jan van der Vaart, and Jan Warnaar (born 1936).

== See also ==
- List of Dutch ceramists
