= Hans de Jong =

Dutch sculptor, designer and ceramist (1932 – 2011)

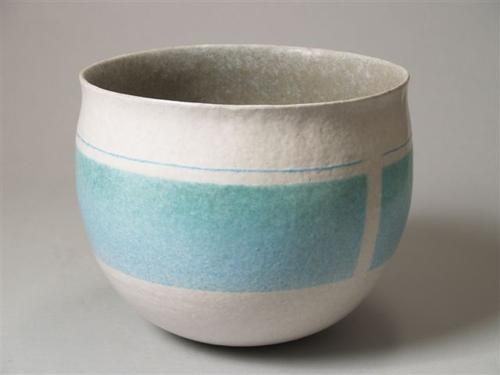
Bowl with striped decor by Hans de Jong, 1982

Hans de Jong (26 March 1932 – 3 March 2011) was a Dutch sculptor, designer and ceramist.

== Life and work ==
Born in Leiden, De Jong received his first lessons in pottery in the studio of Gerrit de Blanken (1894–1961) in Zoeterwoude in 1948. He attended the Gerrit Rietveld Academie, where he studied at the ceramics department under Willem H. de Vries (1908-1969).

In the year 1958-59 De Jong was designer at Intercodam Tegels, which produced glass mosaics and tile panels. In 1959 he started his own studio in Amsterdam. In 1962 De Jong took part of an exhibition of six young ceramists from Amsterdam in Museum Boijmans Van Beuningen, together with Sonja Landweer, Jan de Rooden, Johan van Loon, Jan van der Vaart and Johnny Rolf, which signified the rebirth of artisan ceramics in the Netherlands.

In the 1960s and 1970s he designed several larger ceramic wall sculptures, among others for swimming pools in Utrecht. From 1970 to 1972 he taught at the Royal Academy of Art, The Hague and from 1974 to 1982 at the Academie voor Beeldende Vorming (AHK) in Amsterdam.

== See also ==
- List of Dutch ceramists
