= Johnny Rolf =

Dutch drawing artist and sculptor (born 1936)

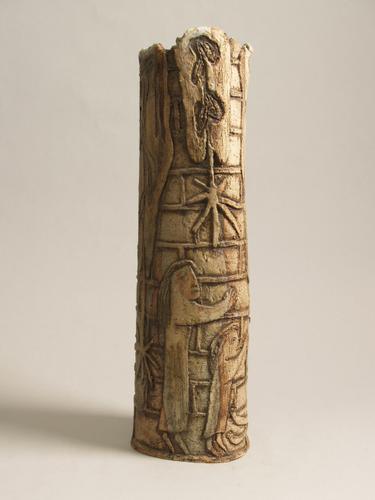
Recluse vase by Johnny Rolf, 1970

Johanna Jacoba (Johnny) Rolf (born 30 September 1936, in The Hague) is a Dutch ceramist, drawing artist and sculptor.

== Life and work ==
Rolf was educated into the pottery profession by Jan de Rooden, with whom she started a studio in 1958 and married. One of her students was the Dutch ceramist Mariet Schmidt, born in Schiedam in 1935.

In 1962 Rolf took part of an exhibition of six young ceramists from Amsterdam in Museum Boijmans Van Beuningen, together with Hans de Jong, Sonja Landweer, Johan van Loon, Jan de Rooden and Jan van der Vaart, which signified the rebirth of artisan ceramics in the Netherlands. In 1966 she was visiting designer at the Gustavsberg porcelain factory in Zweden.

In 1964 she and Jan de Rooden were awarded the "Contour Prijs" by De Koninklijke Porceleyne Fles in Delft.

== Works in public collections ==
- Gemeentemuseum Den Haag
- Princessehof Ceramics Museum
- Stedelijk Museum Amsterdam

== See also ==
- List of Dutch ceramists
