= Gerrit de Blanken =

Dutch potter (1894 – 1961)

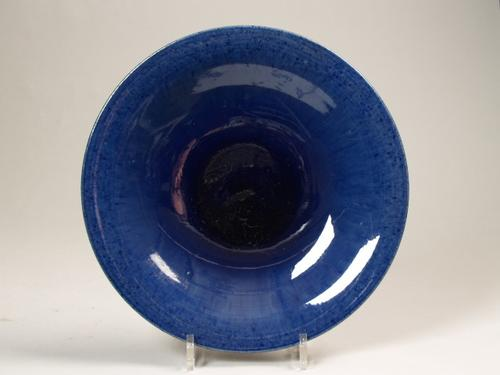
Dish with internal monochrome blue glaze and external brown glaze, 1921-63

Gerrit de Blanken (Leiderdorp, 12 October 1894 – Zoeterwoude, 6 May 1961) was a Dutch potter trained for running serial work, but he gradually focussed on art pottery.

== Life and work ==
In 1910 de Blanken began working at a flower-pots turning in Leiderdorp. Subsequently, he worked at several potteries, including the tile factory Amphora in Oegstgeest.

Since 1924 he was an independent potter with his own studio, successively in Leiderdorp (1919-1925) and in Zoeterwoude-Rijndijk. He made simple utilitarian and decorative pottery, that was sold by, among others, 't Binnenhuis and Metz & Co.

Gerrit de Blanken manufactured exclusively turned pottery. His work has a sober style and is often very thin. Striking is the frequent use of different colours for the interior and exterior of a container or dish. He also produced ceramic designs by Chris Lebeau. One of his students in Zoeterwoude was Hans de Jong.

His work is included in the collections of the Gemeentemuseum Den Haag in The Hague, the Museum Boijmans Van Beuningen in Rotterdam, and the Princessehof Ceramics Museum in Leeuwarden.

== Gallery ==
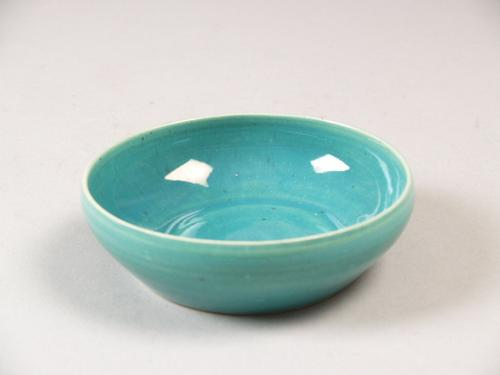
Scale monochrome turquoise glaze, 1955–61

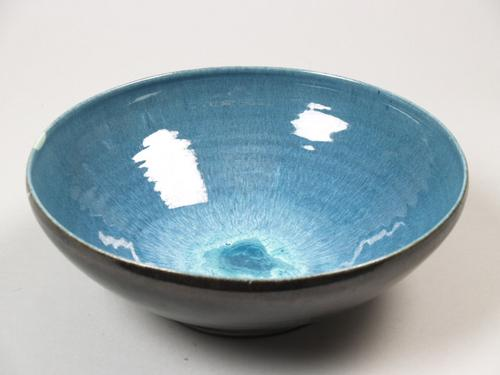
Bowl covered with (external) black, (internal) blue and green running glaze in the center, 1930–60

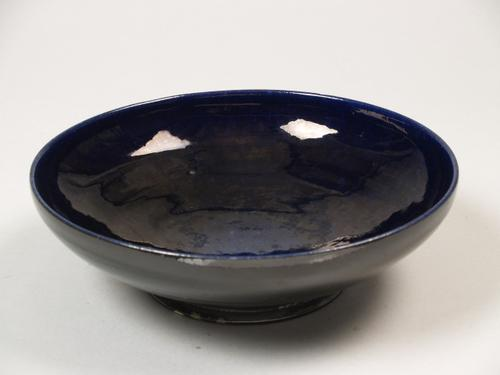
Bowl covered with monochrome deep blue to black enamel, 1955–61

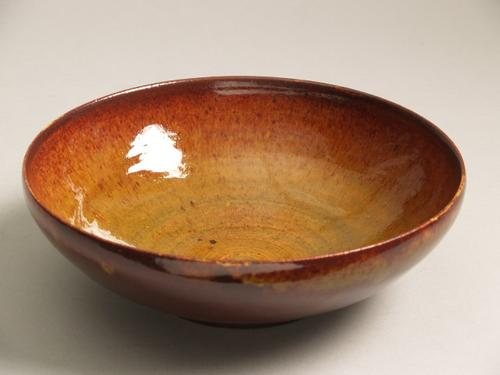
Bowl with enamel decoration, 1955–61

== See also ==
- List of Dutch ceramists
