= Vilma Henkelman =

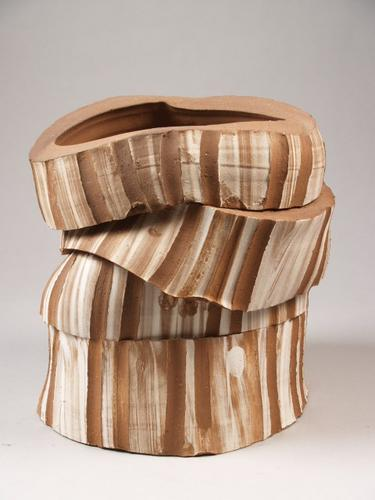
Bandenpot No. 3 door Vilma Henkelman, 1981

Vilma Maria Helena Henkelman (born 15 October 1944 in Rotterdam - died 20 March 2023) was a Dutch sculptor, ceramist, and photographer.

== Live and work ==
Born in Rotterdam, Henkelman took pottery lessons from Emmy van Deventer, and studied ceramic design at the Free Academy in The Hague. In 1967 she started working as assistant in the pottery factory Groeneveldt. In 1969 she started her own studio in The Hague at the Bagijnstraat. In 1975 moved to Amsterdam, where she started a studio and gallery at the Veerkade. From 1989 to 2005 she ran an own studio in Vlaardingen.

A 1985 exhibition brochure summarized, that "in her free plastic forms she wants above all to express the essence of the primordial matter. In order to show the strength and vitality of the clay, therefore, they do not use a glaze... she works with pottery clay and forms with a quick twist technique. She bakes in an electric furnace to 1020 degrees."

Her work is in the collection of the Princessehof Ceramics Museum in Leeuwarden.

== See also ==
- List of Dutch ceramists
- List of Dutch sculptors
