= Jan de Rooden =

Dutch ceramist and sculptor (1931 - 2016)

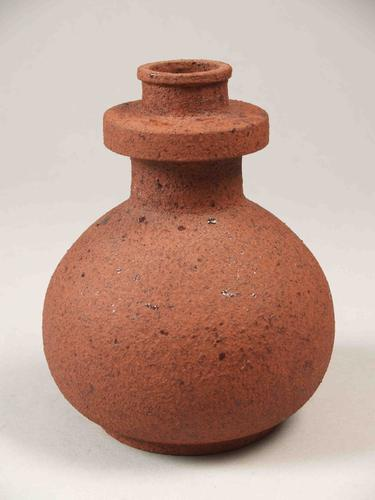
Vase covered with red engobe, 1961.

Jan de Rooden (31 August 1931 - 1 April 2016) was a Dutch ceramist and sculptor, who worked in Nijmegen, Paris, and Amsterdam.

== Life and work ==
Born in Nijmegen, De Rooden grew up in Groesbeek and was seminarist in Haastrecht from 1945 to 1953. After a stay in Paris and being rejected for military service, he decided to become a potter.

As autodidact he started working in the studio of ceramist Lucie Q. Bakker in Amsterdam in 1956. In 1958, he started his own studio with Johnny Rolf, whom he later married. In 1962 De Rooden took part of an exhibition of six young ceramists from Amsterdam at the Museum Boijmans Van Beuningen, together with Hans de Jong, Sonja Landweer, Johan van Loon, Johnny Rolf and Jan van der Vaart, which signified the rebirth of artisan ceramics in the Netherlands. In 1966, he was visiting designer at the Gustavsberg porcelain factory in Zweden.

In 1964, he and Johnny Rolf were awarded the "Contour Prijs" by De Koninklijke Porceleyne Fles in Delft. Funded by scholarships from the Dutch Ministry of Culture, De Rooden traveled to the United States in 1968–69, Asia, especially Japan and Korea in 1973–74, and Egypt in 1984. Over the years, he participated in multiple local, national, and international exhibitions in Europe, Japan and the U.S.A.

== Work in public collections ==
- Gemeentemuseum Den Haag
- Keramisch Museum Goedewaagen
- Museum Boijmans Van Beuningen
- Princessehof Ceramics Museum
