= Sonja Landweer =

Dutch artist and ceramist (1933–2019)

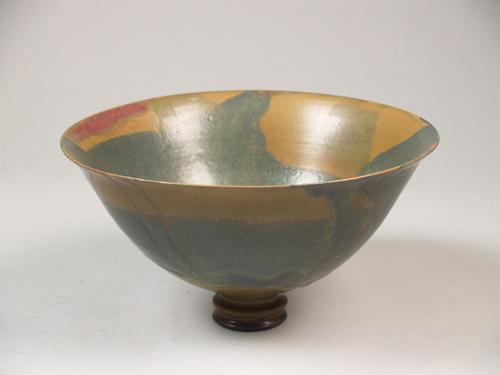
Bowl with glaze decoration by Sonja Landweer, 1962

Sonja Landweer (20 April 1933 – 15 December 2019) was a Dutch multi-disciplinary artist, who lived and worked in Ireland for much of her life. Initially a ceramicist, she later also became known for her bronze castings with unique patinations and subtle forms, and painted, and made prints, jewellery and pottery.

== Life and work ==
Landweer was born in Amsterdam, the eldest child of three; her parents were German artist and teacher, Erna Benter-Landweer, and Dutch registrar of births and deaths, Pieter Landweer. She studied ceramics at the Gerrit Rietveld Academie in the early 1950s, and started her own art studio in 1954.

In 1962 she took part in an exhibition of six young ceramists from Amsterdam in Museum Boijmans Van Beuningen, together with Hans de Jong, Jan de Rooden, Johan van Loon, Jan van der Vaart and Johnny Rolf, which signified the rebirth of artisan ceramics in the Netherlands.

In 1965, she was invited to move to Ireland to revitalise Irish craft and design as part of a group of international artists. Having moved, she met Barrie Cooke. They lived at The Island, Thomastown, which later became Grennan Mill Art School, and later Jerpoint Abbey. They had one child, Aoine, in 1966. Landweer remained a resident of Ireland for the rest of her life, with the exception of a two-year medical residence in the UK. Landweer and Cooke separated in the 1980s but remained friends and supporters of each other's arts.

She was artist-in-residence at the Kilkenny Design Workshops, and a teacher. While in Kilkenny, she came into contact with Lance Clark of C. & J. Clark, and inspired him to develop his Desert Trek shoe design.

In 1981 she was elected to membership of the national arts academy, Aosdána. She continued drawing, painting, print-making, working in bronze, and making jewellery and pottery.

== Recognition ==
Landweer was awarded the Verzetsprijs in Holland in 1964; the prix artistique at the Biennale Internationale de Ceramique d’Art, Vallauris, France in 1974 and the 1992 honorary award from NCAD.

== Work in public collections ==
The work of Landweer is held in several public collections worldwide, a selection:

- Frans Hals Museum, Haarlem
- Princessehof Ceramics Museum
- Hildesheim Stadtisches Museum, Germany
- Museum of Decorative Arts, Copenhagen
- Ulster Museum
