= Marianna Franken =

Dutch ceramicist (1928–2025)

- Born: Marianna Virginia Franken; 2 February 1928; Amsterdam, Netherlands
- Died: 15 February 2025 (aged 97); Laren, North Holland, Netherlands
- Education: University of California, Berkeley
- Occupations: Ceramicist, potter
- Years active: 1955–2017

Marianna Virginia Franken (2 February 1928 – 15 February 2025), also known as M.V. Franken, was a Dutch ceramicist and potter. She actively worked from 1955 until 2017 making ceramics.

== Life and career ==
Marianna Virginia Franken was born on 2 February 1928, in Amsterdam, Netherlands.

Between 1946 and 1955, she studied radiology at the University of California, Berkeley. While she was living in California, her brother Gerard who had also lived in California, served in the United States Army during World War II.

When she returned to Amsterdam after 1955, Franken focused her studies on ceramics with Emmy van Deventer. Franken had a ceramics studio in Amsterdam from 1958 to 1960, and afterwards she moved her studio to Hoogland in Utrecht, Netherlands. Franken briefly studied at the Farnham School of Art in England in 1964. She moved to Voorthuizen in Gelderland, Netherlands from 1969 to 1992, followed by a move to Blaricum in North Holland, Netherlands.

She died at the age of 97, on 15 February 2025 in the Rosa Spier Huis retirement home in Laren, North Holland, Netherlands.

Franken's ceramics are in museum collections, including at Museum Arnhem, Museum Boijmans Van Beuningen, and Centraal Museum.
