= Henk Trumpie =

Dutch ceramist and sculptor (born 1937)

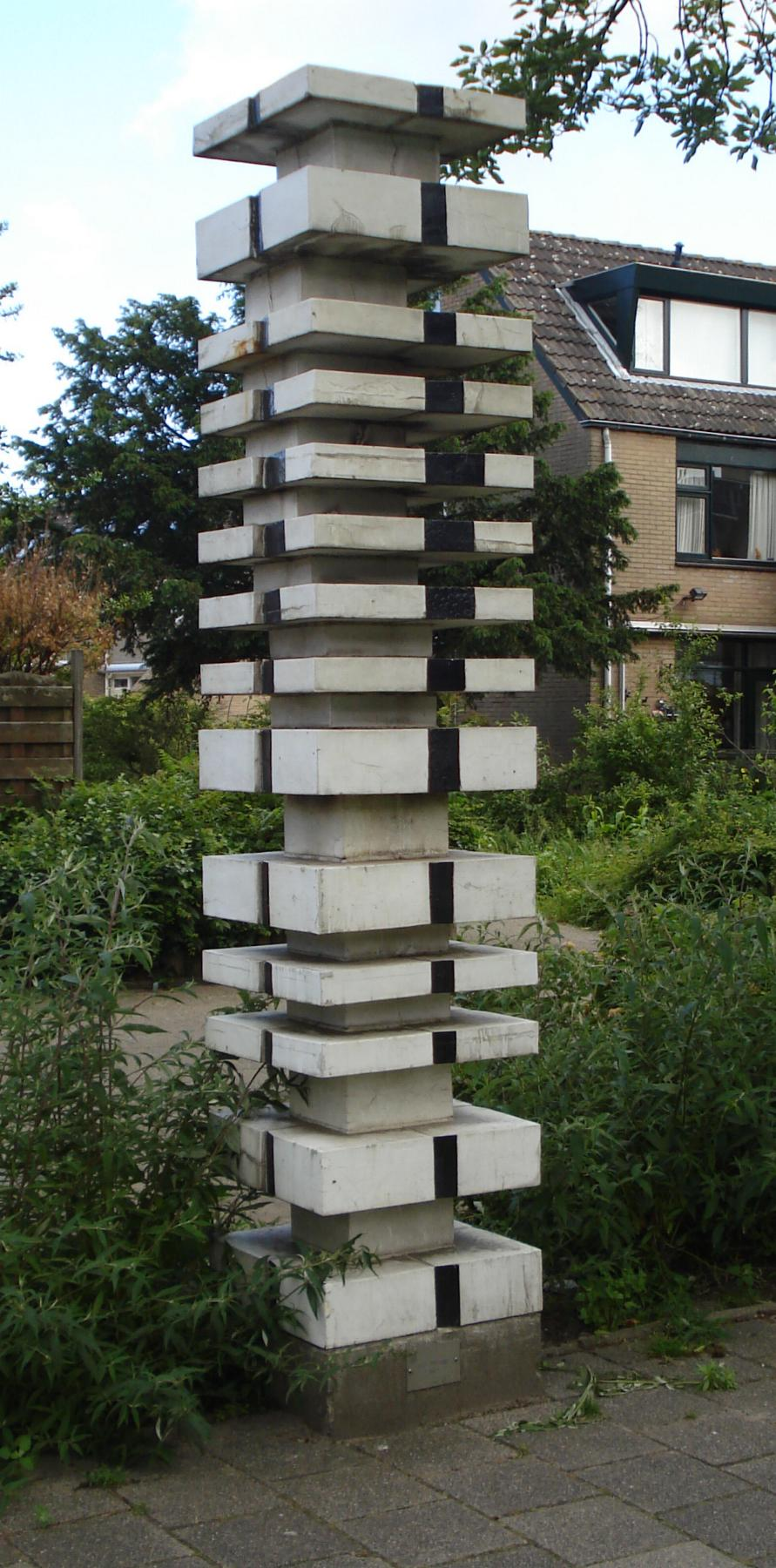
"Pilar", Voorburg, 1971

Henk Trumpie (born The Hague, 8 August 1937) was a Dutch ceramist and sculptor.

== Life and work ==
Born in The Hague, Trumpie studied at the Royal Academy of Art, The Hague, and took glaze lessons at the Porceleyne Fles pottery in Delft, where he was involved in the production of ceramic works for other artists, such as Karel Appel.

In 1969, he and Jacques van Gaalen founded the ceramics studio Struktuur 68. Gwen Heeney (2003) recalled, that "the studio has applied itself to the manufacturing of large-scale ceramic sculpture in collaboration with many international artists (many of whom have been unfamiliar with ceramics)". In 1968, they started working with the CoBrA group. Over the years, they "completed around 1000 successful commissions in collaboration with more than 200 national and international artists".

In 1980, Trumpie started as lecturer at the Rietveld Academy, beside Jan van der Vaart, as successor to Emmy van Deventer, which became "an enormous stimulus for the creation of monumental ceramics at the Academy". Among his students were Anna Carlgren, Wietske van Leeuwen and Lia van Rhijn.

== See also ==
- List of Dutch ceramists
