= Clemens van den Broeck =

Dutch goldsmith

- Born: 21 June 1943 (age 82); Maastricht, Netherlands
- Education: Academy of Art and Design in ’s-Hertogenbosch
- Known for: Goldsmith

Clemens van den Broeck (born 1943) is a Dutch artist, and goldsmith.

Van den Broeck studied at the Academy for Art and Design of ’s-Hertogenbosch (1959–1965), specialising as sculptor, goldsmith, ceramist and craftsman. .

Since 1965 until 1970 van den Broeck attended the workshop of Jan Noyons in Utrecht, working for the brand name “Brom”. There he experimented with the noble materials, which later switched for much cheaper goods, like base metals mixed with plastic, wood, stones, alpaca and glass.

The “Atelier Marecage” was his working place in the 1970s, where in addition to these innovative materials he started designing organic shapes.

In 1978 he co-founded with Astrid Wiegerinck the “Flora Gallery” in Eindhoven. This place became a central exhibiting spot for artists and craft makers from Eindhoven and in 1983 the gallery changed his placement and name for “Flora Design”. Clemens van den Broeck has worked as a lecturer at the School of Art and Design of Eindhoven (SKVE, 1987) and has been member of the Artists’ Society of Amersfoort 'De Ploegh' (AKG 'De Ploegh', 1937–2003).
