= Eugene Horak =

Polish painter and woodblock printmaker

Eugene (Eugeniusz) Horak, (Eugene Damara) (March 1914 – October 1972) was a Polish painter and woodblock printmaker.

He graduated from the Academy of Art and Design St. Joost (Akademie voor Kunst en Vormgeving St. Joost, Breda, Netherlands) in 1930's, and became a graphic artist. His works includes several thousand etchings, usually rather small, and many drawings and paintings. His prints represent in detail the life of people during and after the World War II period. He also painted many portraits of Polish gentry and was interested in Huguenot and Polish history, making some paintings on the topics. Also, a lot of his work was dedicated to Breda, Netherlands, where he spent most of his life. He later moved to Cleveland, Ohio.
