= Just van Deventer =

Dutch ceramist

Joost (Just) van Deventer (Leiden, 6 August 1906 – Amsterdam, 26 August 1957) was a Dutch ceramist, and lecturer the AKV St. Joost.

== Life and work ==
Van Deventer was born in Leiden, were his father ran a wine store. After secondary school he started working as sales agent for a flower factory and married Emmy van Deventer in 1936. He took pottery classes from Koosje Hazewindus, a student of Bert Nienhuis.

In 1936 Just and Emmy Van Deventer moved to Amsterdam-Zuid, where they lived among artists as Nel Houtman, Fred Carasso, and Jan Wolkers. In 1941 he started a ceramic studio with Theo Dobbelmann. After the war he started the ceramic factory "De Marmot," next to the studio of John Rädecker. From 1950 to 1956 he lectured at the Free Academy in The Hague, and from 1953 until his death in 1957 at the AKV St. Joost in Breda.

Among his student were Jaap de Boer (1932-), Frank van Brakel, Beatrijs Nietzsche-Chavannes, Johan Jan Mulder, and Jan van der Vaart. In 1953 he became a member of the Sint Lucas association in Amsterdam

== See also ==
- List of Dutch ceramists
