= Chris Lanooy =

Dutch potter and designer (1881–1948)

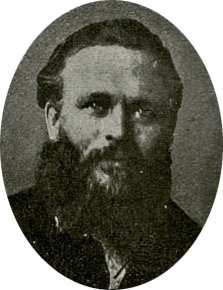
Chris Lanooy, 1925.

Johannes Christiaan "Chris" Lanooy (16 March 1881 – 24 January 1948) was a Dutch potter and designer, who worked as ceramist, painter, draftsman and sculptor, and he produced stained-glass art.

== Life and work ==
Lanooy was born in Sint-Annaland i 1881 as son of Cornelis Lanooij and Janna van 't Hof. Lanooy studied at the Royal Academy of Art, The Hague and was a student of the Roermond architect and artist Pierre Cuypers and Gouda painter and art teacher Jan Lugthart. As a ceramist, he was an autodidact.

He worked at ceramic factories in The Hague, Gouda en Purmerend, and at the Royal Leerdam Crystal glass factory in Leerdam. His work has been exhibited regularly at home and abroad. The Princessehof Ceramics Museum in Leeuwarden has more than a hundred works of Lanooy in the collection. In 2002 this museum dedicated a retrospective exhibition of his work. Twenty-five years earlier, in 1977, this museum also dedicated an exhibition to his work. This exhibition was opened by the then Minister of Culture, Recreation and Social work, Harry van Doorn.

Lanooy was married to Joanna Elisabeth Schuitemaker. He died in January 1948 at the age of 66 in the province of Gelderland in Epe. In September 2008, the renewed council hall of the town hall of Epe was renamed the Lanooy lounge, and contained a stained glass window of Lanooy.

== Public collections ==
Among the public collections holding works by Chris Lanooy are:

- Museum de Fundatie, Zwolle, Netherlands
- Kröller-Müller Museum, Netherlands

== Gallery ==
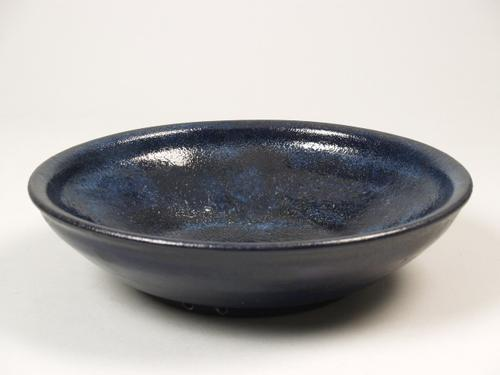
Plate with monochrome blue glaze, 1925–50

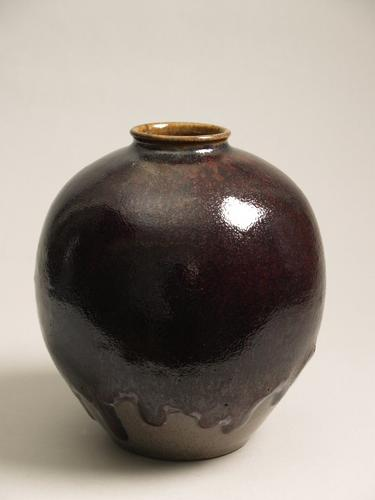
Vase with glaze decoration, 1925–50

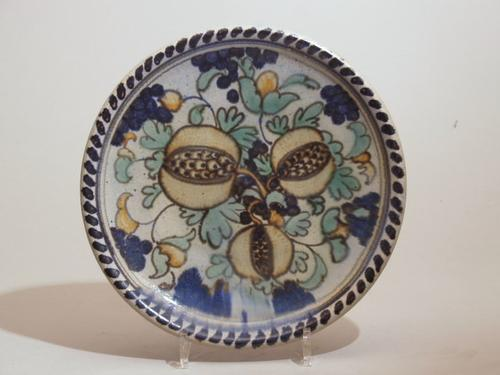
Dish with polychrome decor of pomegranates, 1930

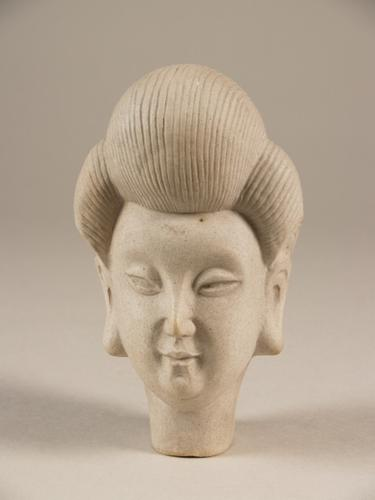
Plastic art, head of Guanyin, 1950

== See also ==
- List of Dutch ceramists
