= Jaap Wolterbeek =

Dutch photographer (1943-2024)

- Born: 22 July 1943; Hardinxveld, Netherlands
- Died: 2 April 2024 (aged 80); Middelburg, Netherlands
- Education: AKV St. Joost (Breda)
- Occupations: cinematographer and photographer

Jaap Wolterbeek (22 July 1943 – 2 April 2024) was a Dutch photographer and cinematographer. He became most known as a press photographer working for various Dutch media outlets and selling many photographs internationally.

== Biography ==
Wolterbeek was born in Hardinxveld in 1943 and grew up in Vlissingen. He graduated from the AKV St. Joost in Breda. He was commissioned in 1969 by the Ministry of Culture to make the short film Rijksweg A58 about the A58 motorway that was named death road due to the many accidents at the time. The film was a success at the 1969 film festival in Arnhem and was broadcast by the Nederlandse Omroep Stichting in 1976. He was also a cinematographer for television program Van Gewest tot Gewest.

He became the first press photographer of Zeeland. Wolterbeek is most known as a press photographer, but also worked for companies. He worked as a press photographer for among others De Telegraaf, Algemeen Dagblad and Dutch news agency Algemeen Nederlands Persbureau. He was at numerous notable events including Borssele Nuclear Power Station protests during the 1980s and the sinking of the Herald of Free Enterprise in 1987. He sold many photographs internationally.

Wolterbeek was married and was father. Wolterbeek suffered from esophageal cancer and later liver cancer. Wolterbeek died in a nursing home in Middelburg on 2 April 2024, at the age of 80.
