= Jan van der Vaart (ceramist) =

20th-century Dutch artist

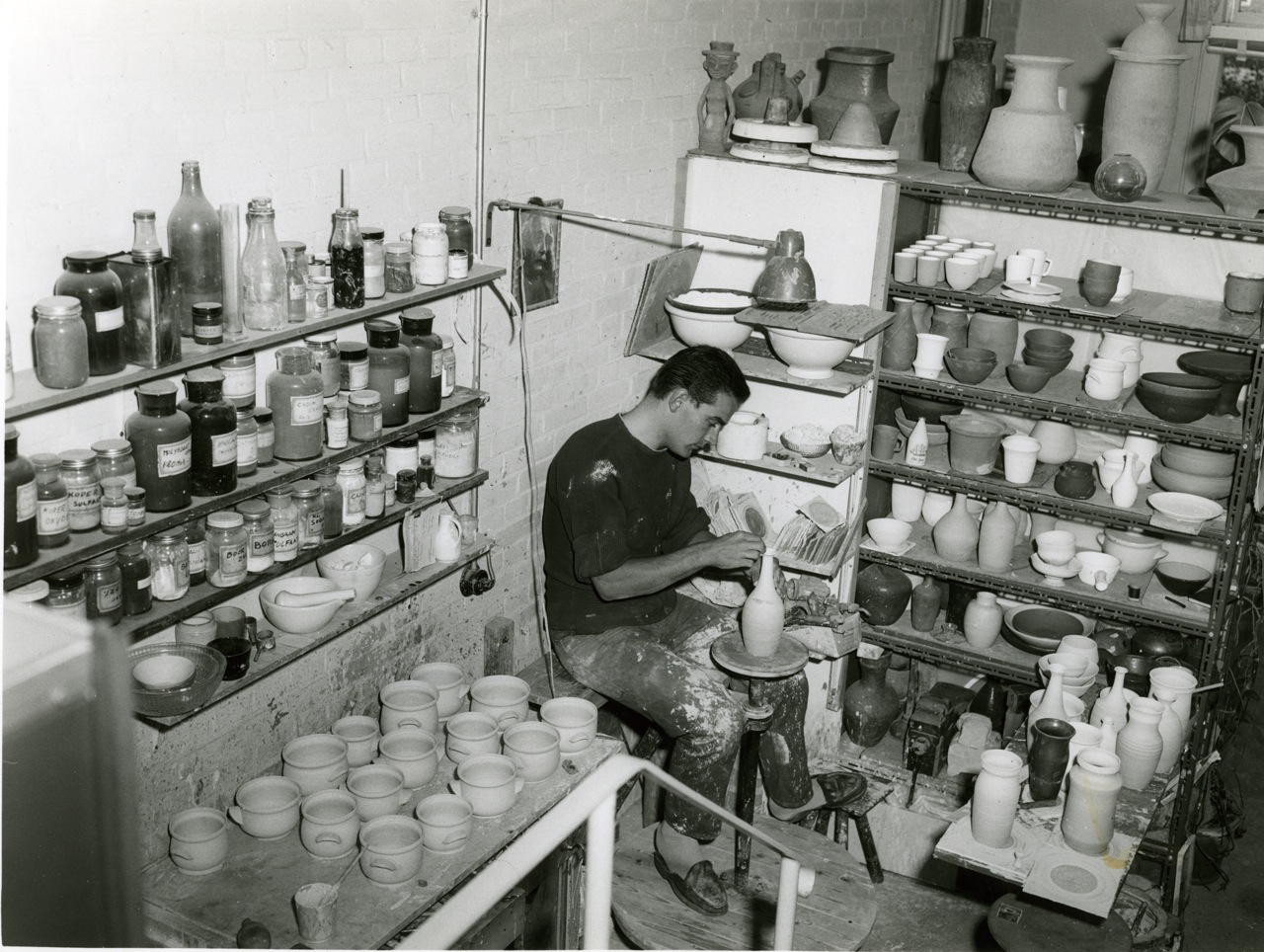
- Jan van der Vaart at work in his studio on the Loevesteinlaan 184 Den Haag, 1950's
- Born: 17 October 1931; Rotterdam, Netherlands
- Died: 8 November 2000 (aged 69); Leiden, Netherlands
- Known for: Ceramics
- Movement: Minimalism, Constructivism
- Awards: Porceleyne Fles Award, 1965; Prix de la Critique, 1967; Emmy Leersum Price, 1988

Johannes Jacobus (Jan) van der Vaart (The Hague, 17 October 1931 – Leiden, 8 November 2000) was an influential Dutch ceramicist from the 20th century, known as founder of the abstract-geometric ceramics in the Netherlands.

One of the key concepts in his work was the reintroduction of the pyramid or tulips tower, a specific type of tulip vase, from the 16th century in his own constructivist form.

== Biography ==
=== Early life and early career ===
Van der Vaart is autodidact, and took a pottery class for amateurs at the Vrije Academie in The Hague from Just van Deventer and Theo Dobbelman. In the 1950s he started working as a ceramicist in The Hague.

In 1958 Van der Vaart was co-founder of the artist collective Groep 58 of seven young artists, five painters, a sculptor and a ceramicist. They wanted to oppose abstract art, in favor of realistic work. With one of the artists, Herman Gordijn, he had one of his first exhibitions in the Haagse Kunstkring, where Van der Vaart had become and would stay a member. A second duo exhibition there in 1960 brought one of their first art reviews in the news paper. Beside multiple other exhibitions tater that year Van der Vaart had his first duo exhibition in Galerie D'Eend in Amsterdam with Peter de Francia.

In 1960 he settled in Amsterdam, and made study trips to Italy, France and England. At first he made his work of stoneware and since 1961 also in porcelain. Inspired by the idea of stacking forms, in 1961 Van der Vaart introduced the theme of the pyramid tulip vase in the contemporary visual arts. With these stack of forms, the Vases and bowls were built from tight, geometric elements, which are combined in different ways. The functional use of his objects are of importance: a vase should contain flowers. The tulip vases and towers consist of twisted or hand-shaped elements, since the 1970s also build with poured out shapes. Van der Vaart re-used these form again for his designs, and fellow potters were inspired by him to the same.

In 1962 Van der Vaart took part of an exhibition of six young ceramicists from Amsterdam in Museum Boijmans Van Beuningen, together with Hans de Jong, Jan de Rooden, Johan van Loon, Sonja Landweer and Johnny Rolf, which signified the rebirth of artisan ceramics in the Netherlands. In those days he started participating in Delft at the annual "Contour onzer beeldende kunst" exhibition, which presented the latest development of contemporary art.

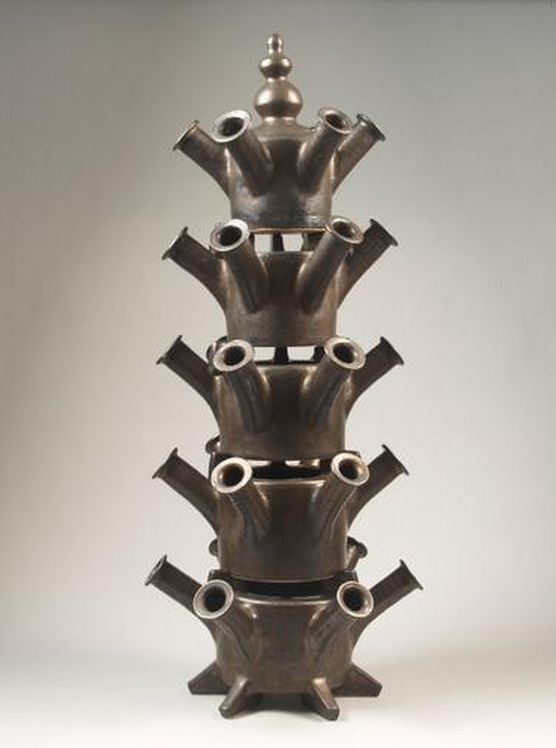
Jan van der Vaart - Tulip vase in 5 parts, bronze glazed 1962

During the 1960s Van der Vaart began designing vases in large format. These unique pieces he designed were no experiments; purity and usability were still an important starting point. The unica were received at various exhibits with much praise and regarded by collectors as true masterpieces. In 1967 it was made be possible to cast his design in small series, making the work affordable for many. In the first decades of his career Van der Vaart had developed and distributed his work himself. Later, some designs were produced at the Royal Tichelaar Makkum, and since 1984 he also designed work for Rosenthal GmbH Germany.

=== Professor at Rietveld Academy and later career ===
In 1968 he was appointed ceramics professor at the Rietveld Academy in Amsterdam, and especially in this position he became innovator of ceramic art in the Netherlands. Until his retirement in 1993 he educated a new generations of potters, such as Geert Lap, Wietske van Leeuwen, Anita Manshanden, Wouter Dam, Irene Vonck, Barbara Nanning, Mieke Blits, Alberdien Rullmann and Esther Stasse assisted by Emmy van Deventer and since 1980 by Henk Trumpie.

In 1991 in the Museum Boijmans Van Beuningen in Rotterdam held the exhibition "Jan van der Vaart 35 years of ceramics," in which his entire career was represented with 350 pieces. Especially for this occasion Van der Vaart designed a fan-shaped vase on a foot, which was produced by the Royal Tichelaar Makkum is produced (in the blue and tomato red color).

Later in life, he started making glass designs for Royal Leerdam and fulfilled assignments from the Czech Republic. Fifty years after the liberation in 1995, Royal Leerdam had two orange vases designed by the then chief designer of Royal Leerdam Siem van der Marel, and Jan van der Vaart. Between 1994 and 1997 Van der Vaart made designs for the Royal Leerdam Leerdam Unica and Leerdam Serica series and some unique utensils. The designs of Van der Vaart can be counted among the best design of the glass factory in decades. The design for the orange vase he made in his characteristic geometric style. It was - like that of Van der Marel - released in a limited edition of 200 pieces.

=== Awards ===
Van der Vaart was awarded the following prices:

- Porceleyne Fles Award, 1965; by the De Koninklijke Porceleyne Fles.
- Prix de la Critique, 1967
- Emmy Leersum Price, 1988

== Work ==
Jan van der Vaart is considered one of the most important Dutch ceramic artists of the 20th century. As the founder of a geometric abstract direction in postwar-ceramics he was nationally and abroad particularly influential. His work is very recognizable due to the distinctive character and the logical and consequent development of his artistic beliefs.

From the beginning the work of Van der Vaart has been sleek and geometric. Purity of form and usability were important requirements for Van der Vaart, and in his work he strove to reach a perfect unity of material, form and glaze. He perceived shape as the most important, and considered decoration detracts from the monumentality of his work. This monumentality went along with the prevailing architecture of that period. His work fit in De Stijl related architecture, which expressed clarity and simplicity. Also, his work is related to the abstract-geometric art production in the Netherlands after De Stijl.

Van der Vaart's work is of clear form, focusing on the use object and undecorated. Vases have been preferred, as well as a construction in turning or casting technique. His designs are blocky, simple and sober: Many clean lines with soft gliding, often sloping surfaces. In addition, Van der Vaart makes ceramics in a more complex style. His work is also distinguished by the special tinted glazes which he put on his vases, mainly the bronze glaze. But also his white vases, with geometric shapes, generally are considered to be his trademark. He also made series in bright pink, lilac and blue.

Van der Vaart wanted to create useful quality ceramics for a wide audience. Thus arose the next are unique 'multiples', objects that have been made in limited editions and signed. As a result, they got the authenticity of unique works of art and at the same time remain affordable. Both are unique as for its multiples, use is often made of the casting technique. In the case of the multiples, the shapes are common in the assembly from a mold, for the unica multiple parts are molded separately, which are then later combined into a single unit.

His work hardly build on predecessors, only influences of foreign ceramicists were featured in his work. Jan van der Vaart greatly admired the German ceramicist Hans Copers, and the English ceramicist Lucie Rie.

=== Gallery ===
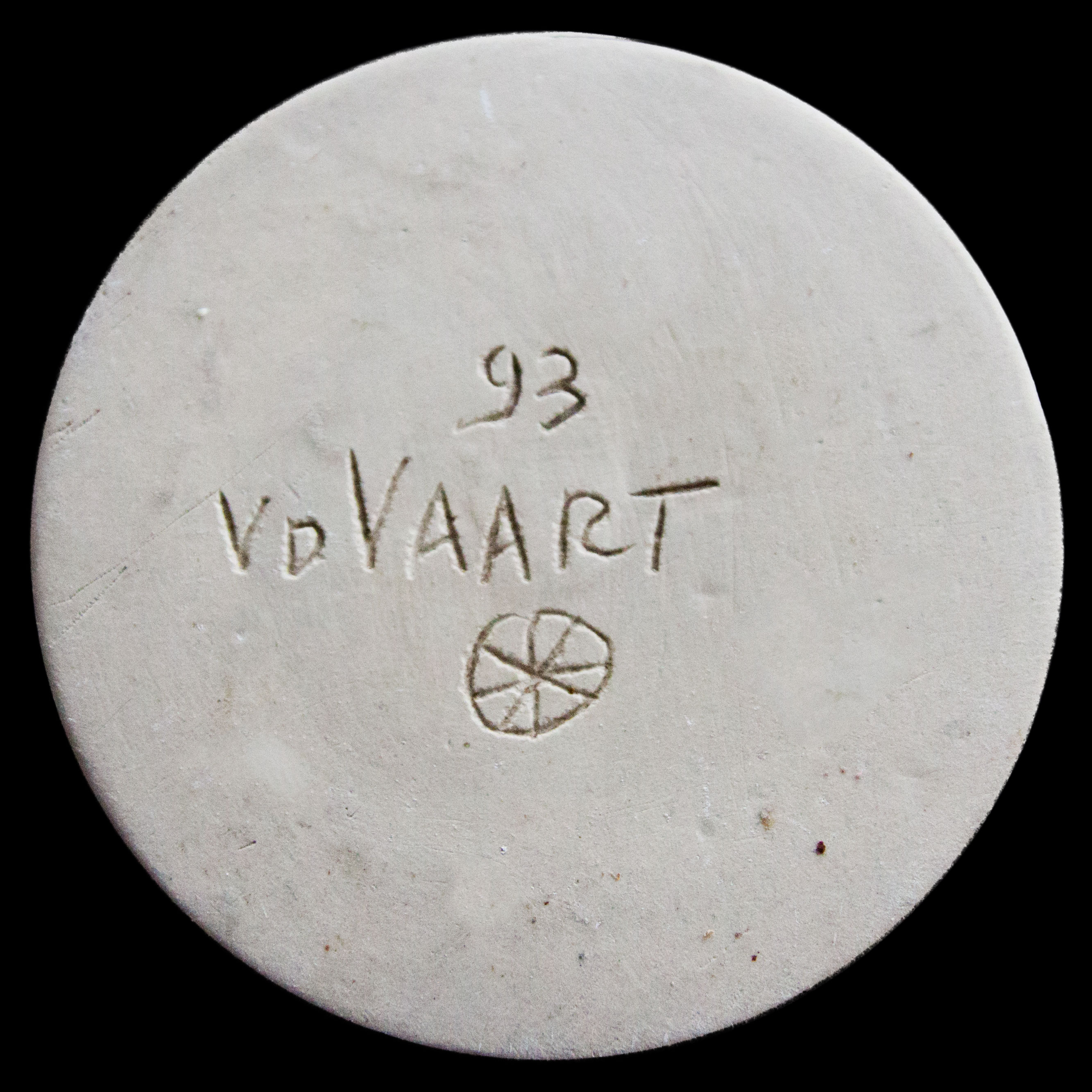
Signature

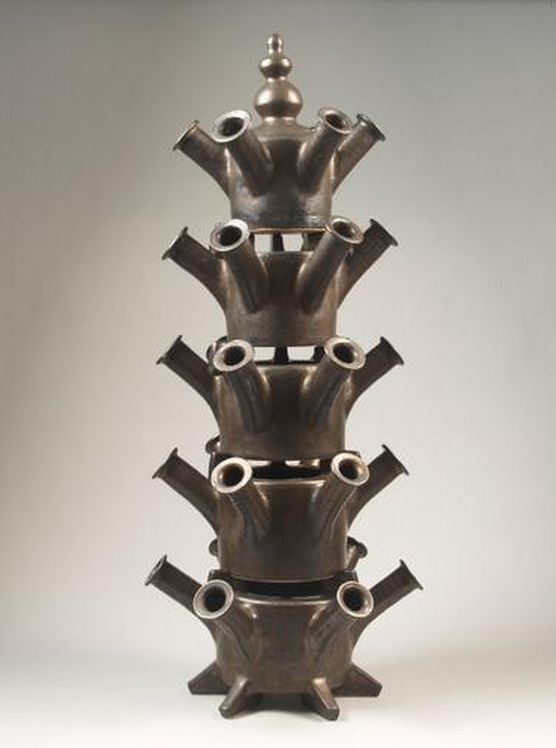
Bronze tulip vase consisting of 5 parts, 1962

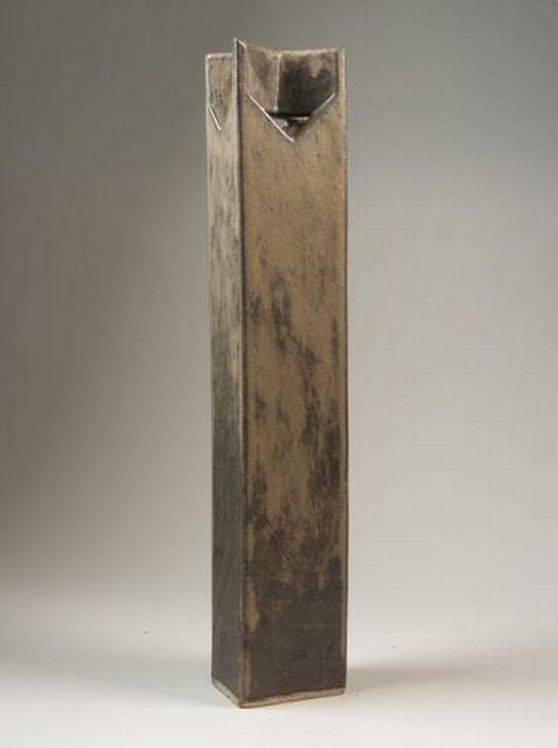
Unicum in bronze glaze, 1965

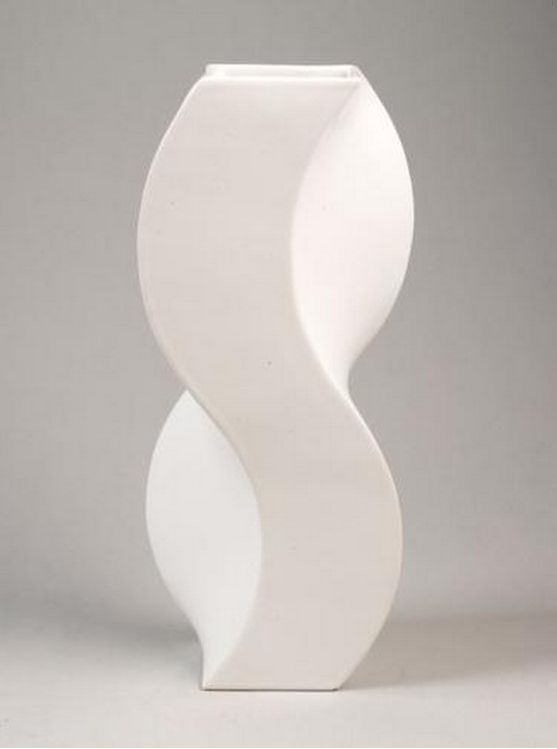
Cast vase S-shaped, white glazed, 1975

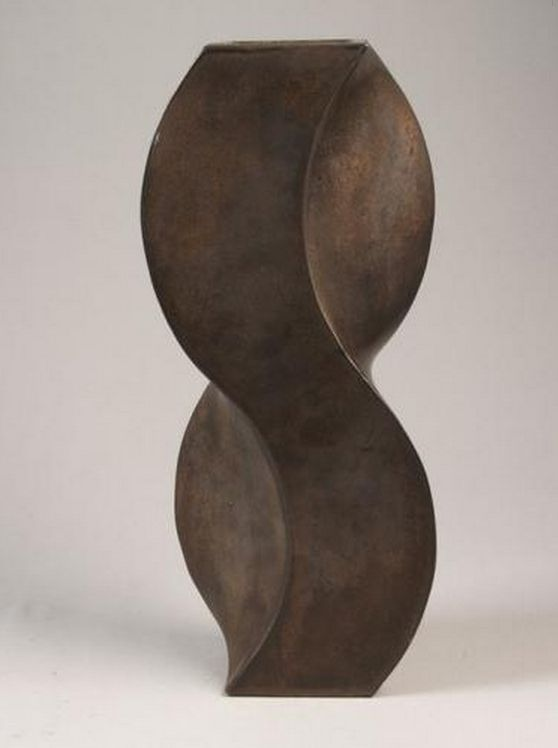
Cast vase S-shaped, bronze-colored glazed, 1975

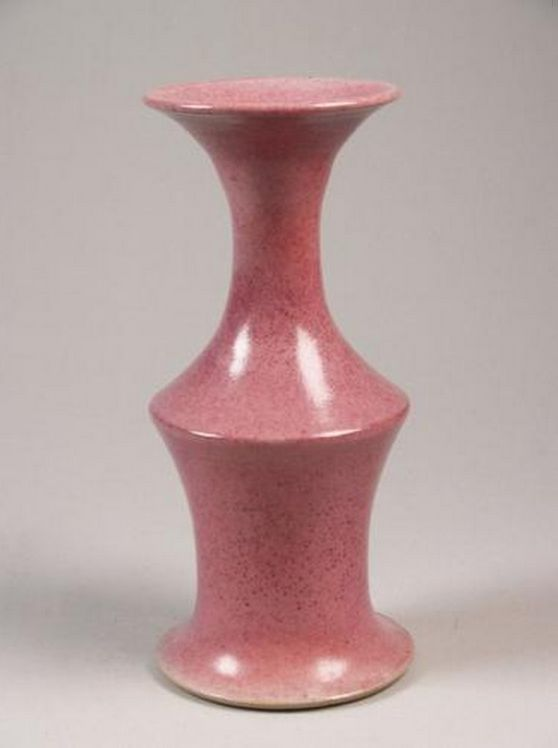
Turned vase with lilac-pink half-mat glazed, 1979

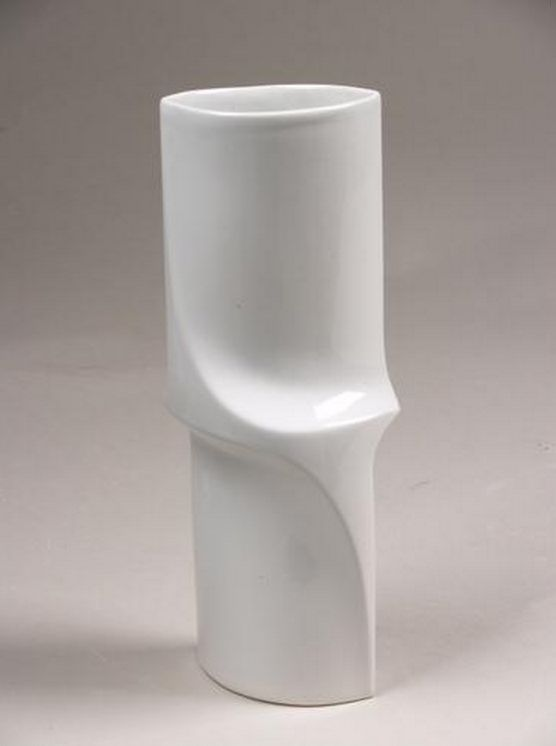
Cast vase, white glazed, 1981

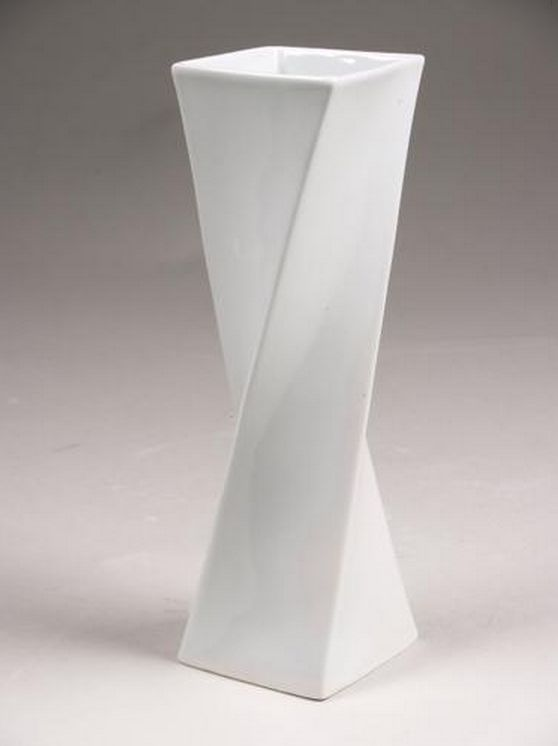
Cast vase, white glazed with a twisted wall, 1985

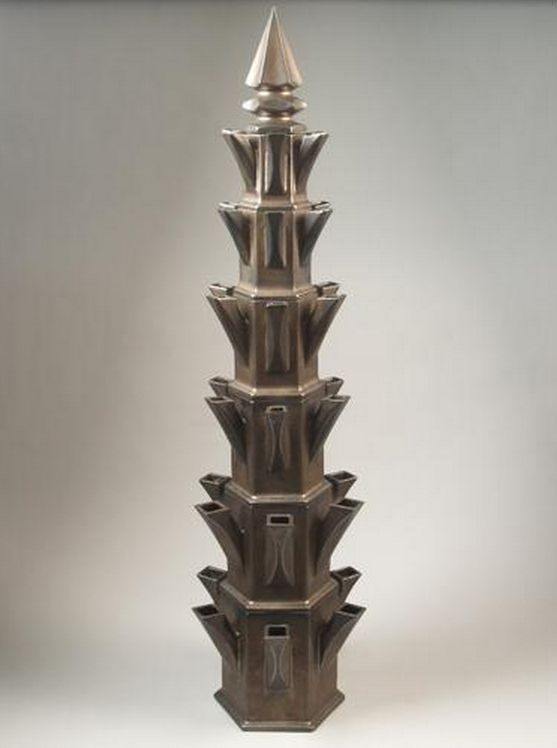
Bronze pyramid consisting of seven hexagonal sections 1988

=== Atelier ===
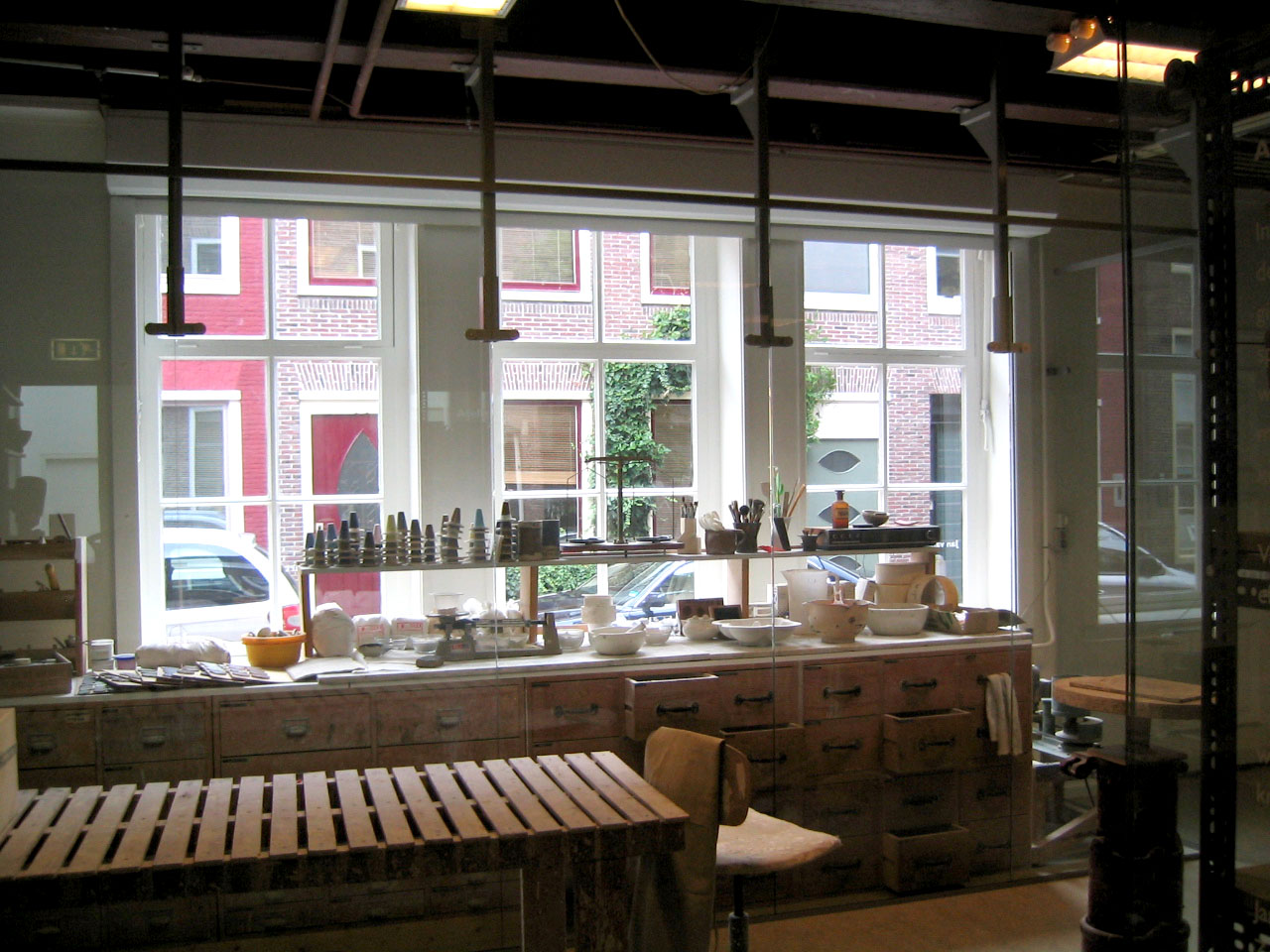
Ceramics studio of Jan van der Vaart in museum Princessehof Leeuwarden.

Since July 1, 2008, the Princessehof Ceramics Museum in Leeuwarden permanently exhibits the ceramics studio of Jan van der Vaart and its complete inventory. The museum had received the inventory from the inherits on the basis of a long-term loan. It is the first permanent presentation of a ceramics studio in a museum in the Netherlands.

In the studio the production of molded ceramics is illustrated by original materials and tools of Van der Vaart. The arrangement shows models, semi-products and molds, turntable and mixer, spray booth, oven and a closet with "powders"; the pigments that color the glaze. In the background Van der Vaarts voice is heard. In an interview from a NPS radio show in 1997, he talks about what bothers him and he casually gives his ideas and secrets.

== Exhibitions, a selection ==
- 1960. Jan van der Vaart and Herman Gordijn, Haagse Kunstkring.
- 1961. Olga Oderkerk, Henny Radijs, Jan van der Vaart, Kunsthandel Ina Broerse, Amsterdam.
- 1961. Solo, galerie Int Constigh Werck, Rotterdam.
- 1962. Six young ceramists from Amsterdam, Museum Boijmans Van Beuningen.
- 1964. Groninger Museum, Groningen.
- 1966. Solo, Kunsthandel Ina Broerse, Amsterdam.
- 1966. Jan v. d. Vaart en Arie de Groot, Galerie Maas, Rotterdam.
- 1997. Jan van der Vaart retrospective. Princessehof Ceramics Museum, Leeuwarden.

== Museums with Van der Vaarts work in their collection ==
- Centraal Museum, Utrecht.
- CODA (Apeldoorn).
- Frans Hals Museum, Haarlem.
- Gemeentemuseum Den Haag, Den Haag.
- Groninger Museum, Groningen.
- Instituut Collectie Nederland.
- Museum Boijmans Van Beuningen, Rotterdam.
- Museum De Fundatie, Zwolle/Heino.
- Museum of Modern Art, New York, Verenigde Staten.
- Museum voor Moderne Kunst Arnhem.
- Nationaal Glasmuseum, Leerdam.
- Princessehof Ceramics Museum, Leeuwarden.
- Stedelijk Museum Amsterdam.
- Stedelijk Museum 's-Hertogenbosch.
- Stedelijk Museum Schiedam.
- Victoria and Albert Museum, London, United Kingdom.

Work in corporate collections

- KPN Art Collection
- TNT art collection
- Schiphol art collection

== See also ==
- List of Dutch ceramicists
