= Spatial design =

Conceptual design discipline

Spatial design is a relatively new conceptual design discipline that crosses the boundaries of traditional design specialisms such as architecture, landscape architecture, landscape design, interior design, urban design and service design as well as certain areas of public art.

It focuses upon the flow of people between multiple areas of interior and exterior environments and delivers value and understanding in spaces across both the private and public realm. The emphasis of the discipline is upon working with people and space, particularly looking at the notion of place, also place identity and genius loci. As such, the discipline covers a variety of scales, from detailed design of interior spaces to large regional strategies, and is largely found within the UK. As a discipline, it uses the language of architecture, interior design and landscape architecture to communicate design intentions. Spatial design uses research methods often found in disciplines such as product and service design, identified by IDEO, as well as social and historical methods that help with the identification and determination of place.

As a growth area of design, the number of spatial design practitioners work within existing disciplines or as independent consultants.

The subject is studied at a number of institutions within the UK, Denmark, Switzerland, and Italy though, as with any new field of study, these courses differ in their scope and ambition.

Ultimately it can be seen as "the glue that joins traditional built environment disciplines together with the people they are designed to serve".

During the COVID-19 pandemic, spatial design became an important aspect of reshaping collective use of urban space and thinking about access and egress.
