= Geert Lap =

Dutch ceramist (1951–2017)

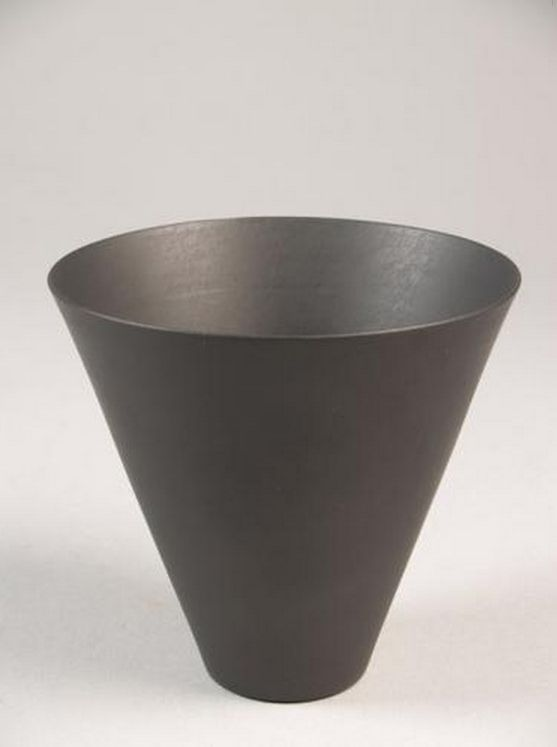
Container shape from series of 99, 1993.

Gerardus Johannes (Geert) Lap (born Venlo, 24 December 1951- 26 April 2017) was a Dutch ceramist, known for his new approach to ceramics characterized as clay minimalism.

== Life and work ==
Geert Lap studied at the AKV St. Joost from 1974 to 1976, and at the Gerrit Rietveld Academie is from 1976 to 1979 under Jan van der Vaart. The first two years in Amsterdam Lap shared a studio with Barbara Nanning, and in 1980 he started his own studio in Amsterdam in his basement apartment. In 1985–86 he lectured at the Design Academy Eindhoven and from 1985 to 1987 also at the Minerva Academy in Groningen.

The Metropolitan Museum of Art recapitulated, that "his earliest works—pure cylindrical forms usually associated with functionality but devoid of spouts, handles, and surface decoration—presage his future ceramic output, although now he has exchanged porcelain for stoneware, a material which he feels is sturdier and allows for sharper forms. Lap works in traditional methods making vases, bowls, and dishes, although he is not concerned with their usability. Each piece is one-of-a-kind and made by his own hand. Color and form are integral."

The Ceramics, Art and Perception journal characterized Geert lap as a "lonely traveller in the field of contemporary Dutch ceramics." They further explained that "Dutch ceramics is as versatile as international ceramics and, at the moment, shows a tendency to the bold, sculptural and narrative postmodernism, whereas Geert Lap has found his power in the consistent exercises in restraint."

== Gallery ==
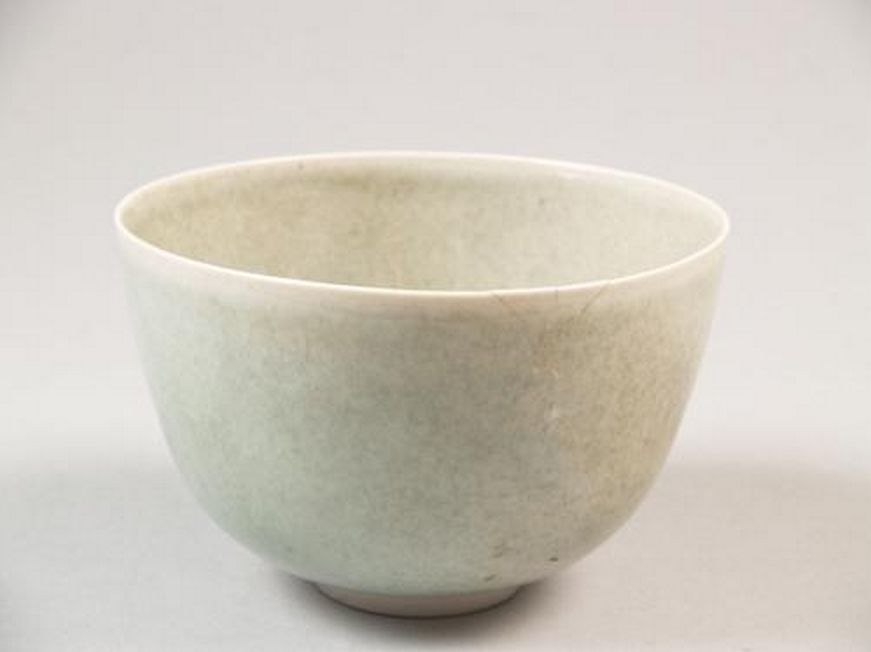
Bowl with small foot ring gray green, 1989

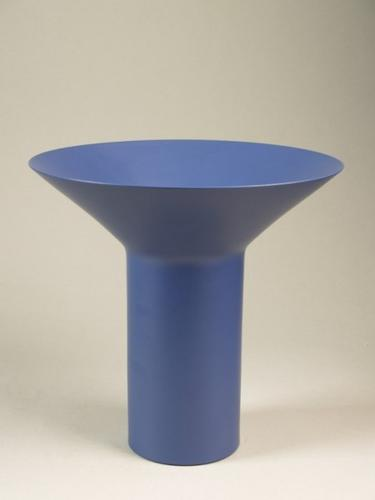
Vase with as met funnel-shaped collar, 1992

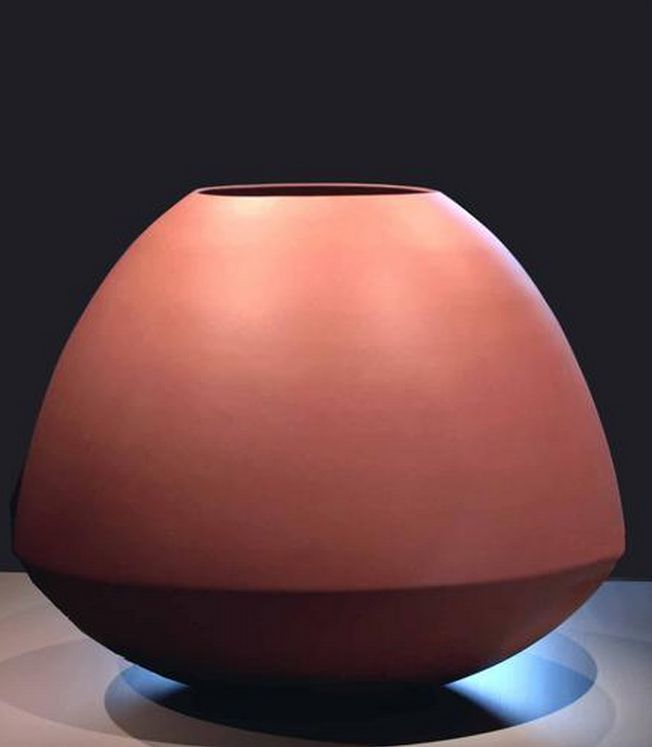
Vase in terra color with bulging belly, 1990-2000
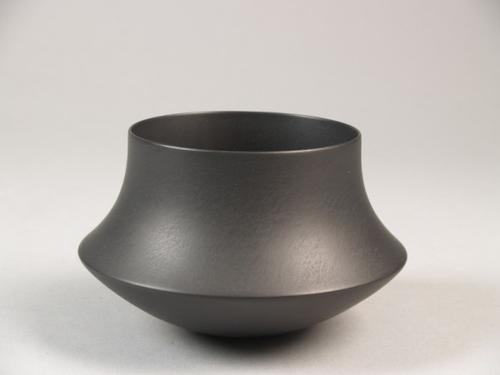
Container shape from series of 99, 1993

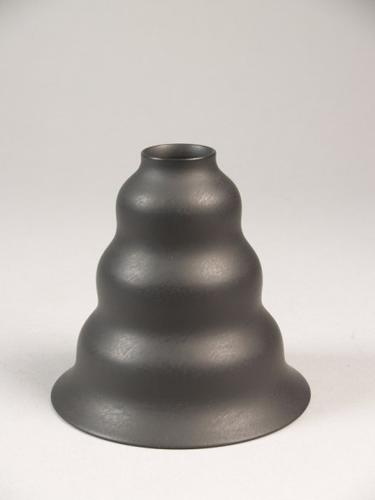
Container shape from series of 99, 1993

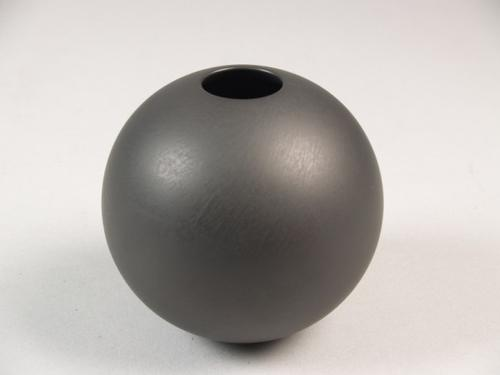
Container shape from series of 99, 1993

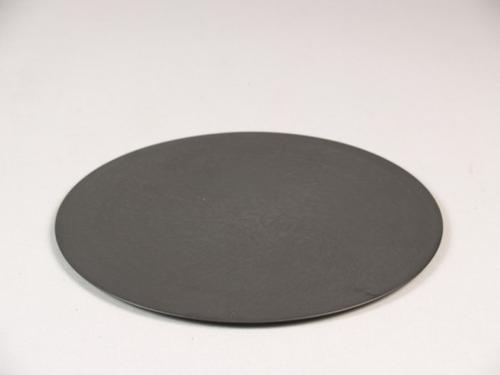
Container shape from series of 99, 1993

== See also ==
- List of Dutch ceramists
