= Johan van Loon =

Dutch ceramist and textile artist (1934–2020)

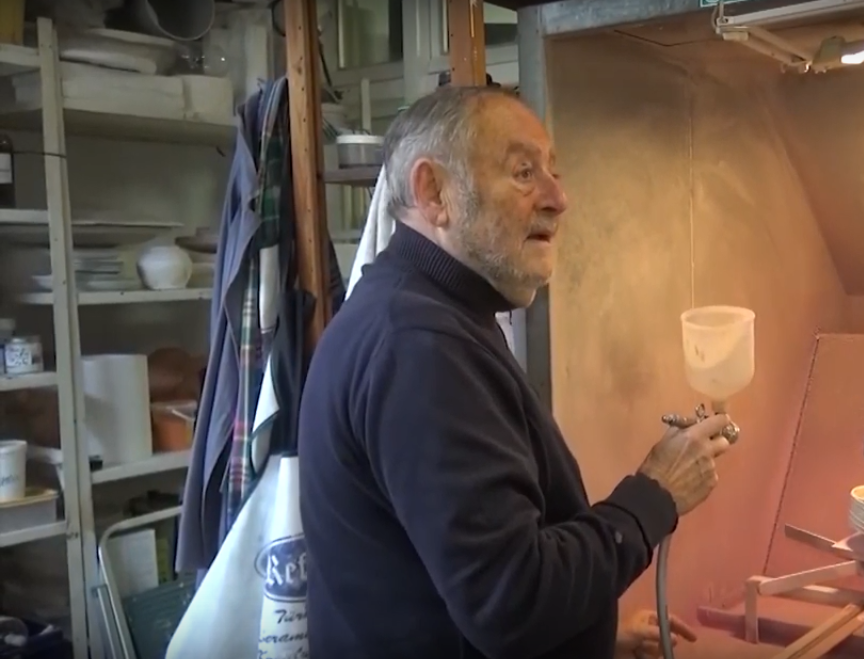
Johan van Loon in his studio (2018)

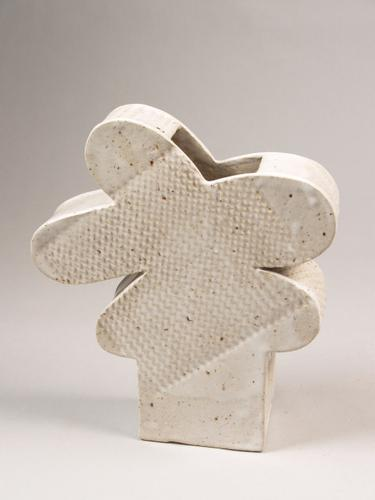
Tree by Johan van Loon, 1972

Johan Gerard van Loon (Rotterdam, 29 October 1934 – Breda, 24 February 2020) was a Dutch ceramist and textile artist.

== Life and work ==
Van Loon studied textile design at the Gerrit Rietveld Academie from 1952 to 1956, and from 1957 to 1960 at the Konstfack in Stockholm under Stig Lindberg. In 1958 he took pottery classes from the Amsterdam potter Jos Eppens van Veen, in 1960 from Thera Hofstede Crull, and in 1961 at the Camberwell College of Arts in London under Lucie Rie.

In 1960 he took another study tour to Scandinavia and worked with Kylikki Salmenhaara for the Arabia porcelain factory in Finland. In 1962 Van Loon took part of an exhibition of six young ceramists from Amsterdam in Museum Boijmans Van Beuningen, together with Hans de Jong, Sonja Landweer, Johnny Rolf, Jan de Rooden and Jan van der Vaart, which signified the rebirth of artisan ceramics in the Netherlands.

In the year 1963–64 he worked with the ceramic designer Stig Lindberg in Stockholm, where he constructed wall ceramics. Back in The Netherlands he started his own studio in Hengelo in 1966. He designed a series of unique ceramic sculpture which were produced by the Royal Copenhagen ceramic factory in Copenhagen. In 1966 he also started to lecture textile design and ceramics at several Dutch art academies. From 1977 to 1986 he lectured at the AKV St. Joost, and late 1980s he founded the ceramics department at the ArtEZ Art & Design in Enschede. Since 1994 he also lectured in Germany.

== See also ==
- List of Dutch ceramists
