= AKV St. Joost =

Art school of Avans University of Applied Sciences

Coordinates: 51°34′45.5″N 4°49′40″E

St. Joost School of Art and Design
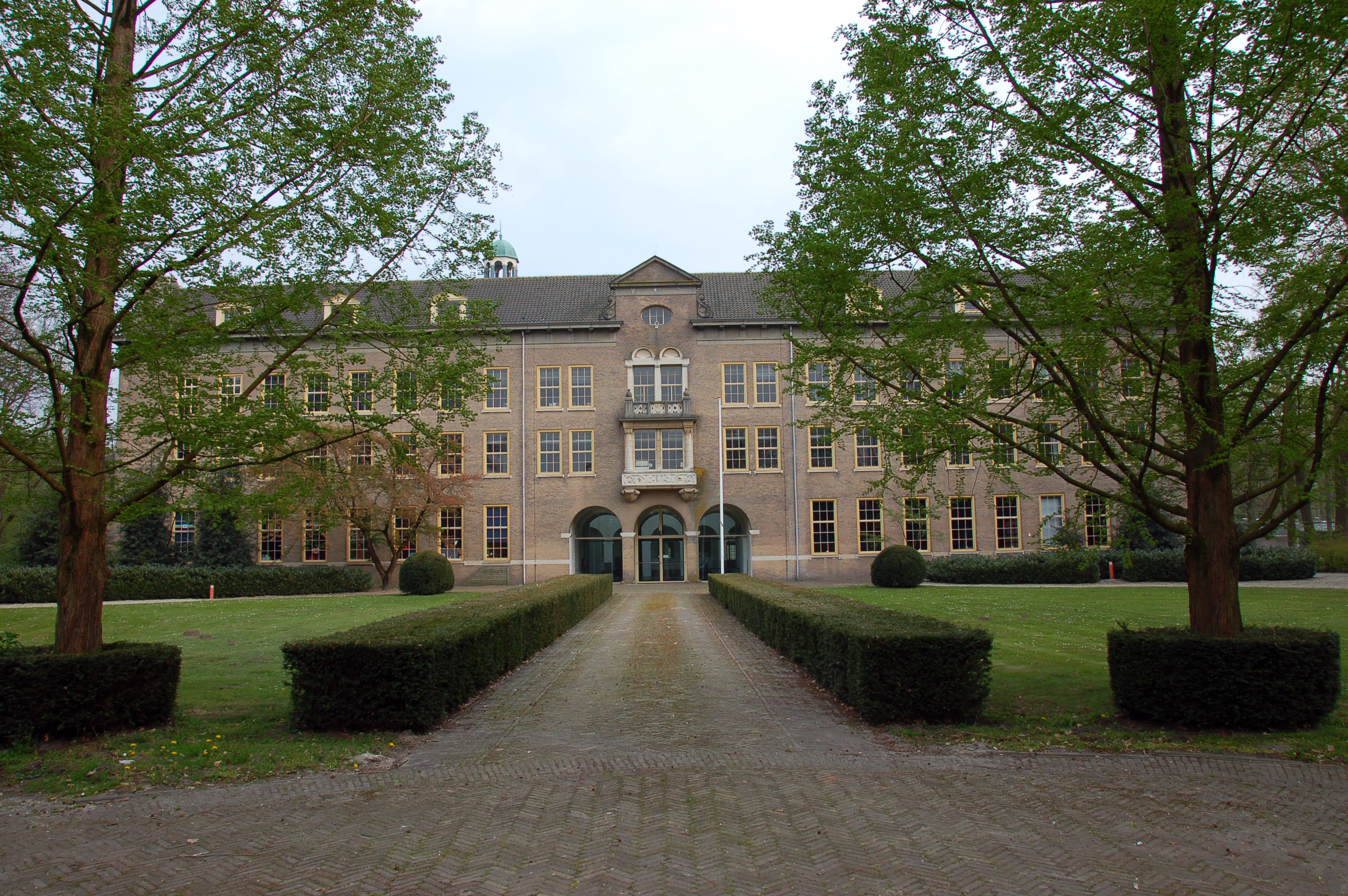
- The school building in Breda
- Breda, North Brabant; Netherlands

Information
- Established: 2004 by merger
- Principal: René Bosma

St. Joost School of Art and Design (formerly Academy of Art and Design St. Joost, Dutch Akademie voor Kunst en Vormgeving St. Joost, Breda) is a Dutch academy of art and design based in Breda and 's-Hertogenbosch. The school is part of Avans University of Applied Sciences with offices in Breda and 's-Hertogenbosch.

== Location ==
The location in Breda is a former seminary on the outskirts of the city.

The school's location in 's-Hertogenbosch is a stone's throw from the railway station. It is a remnant of the school that was originally called Royal Academy of Arts and Design, 's-Hertogenbosch. Up to 2017 this school was situated in the former Remington-typewriter factory on the Onderwijsboulevard. This building is a remarkable design by architect Hugh Maaskant, and especially suitable for a school that requires much natural light. The school was next moved to the EKP building, its current (2018) location. This is a building where mail and packages were handled, located along the railway track just north of the station.

== History ==
=== Predecessors ===
The longest part of the history of St. Joost is formed by the history of its two predecessors: the Royal Academy of Arts and Design of 's-Hertogenbosch, and the Academy for Visual Arts Sint-Joost in Breda.

The school in 's-Hertogenbosch was founded in 1812 as "Royal and Imperial Academy of Painting, Sculpture and Architecture". The oldest roots of St. Joost were in a drawing school started in Breda in 1825. In 1922 an art school was founded in Breda, and later the Free Academy of Visual Art was founded by the artists Dio Rovers, Gerrit de Morée and Niel Steenbergen. These two schools became locations of the new merged school in 2004.

== Bachelor courses ==
Full time

- Visual Arts (Breda and 's-Hertogenbosch)
- Fine arts (Breda)
- Graphic Design (Breda and 's-Hertogenbosch)
- Illustration (Breda and 's-Hertogenbosch)
- Photography (Breda)
- Animation (Breda)
- Audiovisual Design (Breda)
- Spatial Design (Breda)
- Interaction Design (Breda)

All full-time courses start with a foundation year.

Part time

- Fine arts
- Graphic Design
- Photography
- Spatial Design

The time courses Visual Arts, Photography and Audiovisual Design are given in 's-Hertogenbosch, the part-time course Graphic Design and Spatial Design in Breda.

In addition, the school under the name Post-St. Joost three continued to master Photography, Fine Art and Graphic Design.

== Masters courses ==
The school offers four masters programmes through the Masters Institute of Visual Cultures:

- Animation
- Ecology Futures
- Situated Design
- Visual Arts & Post-Contemporary Practice

== Notable faculty and alumni ==
- Chris Berens
- Evert Bloemsma
- Clemens van den Broeck
- Wim Crouwel
- Marlies Dekkers
- Jan van den Dobbelsteen
- Eugene Horak
- Rachel de Joode
- Ruud Kuijer
- Johan van Loon
- Geert Lap
- Marleen Sleeuwits
- Awoiska van der Molen
- Jan van Munster
- Gert Staal
- Jaap Wolterbeek
