= Barbara Nanning =

Dutch sculptor, ceramicist and glass artist

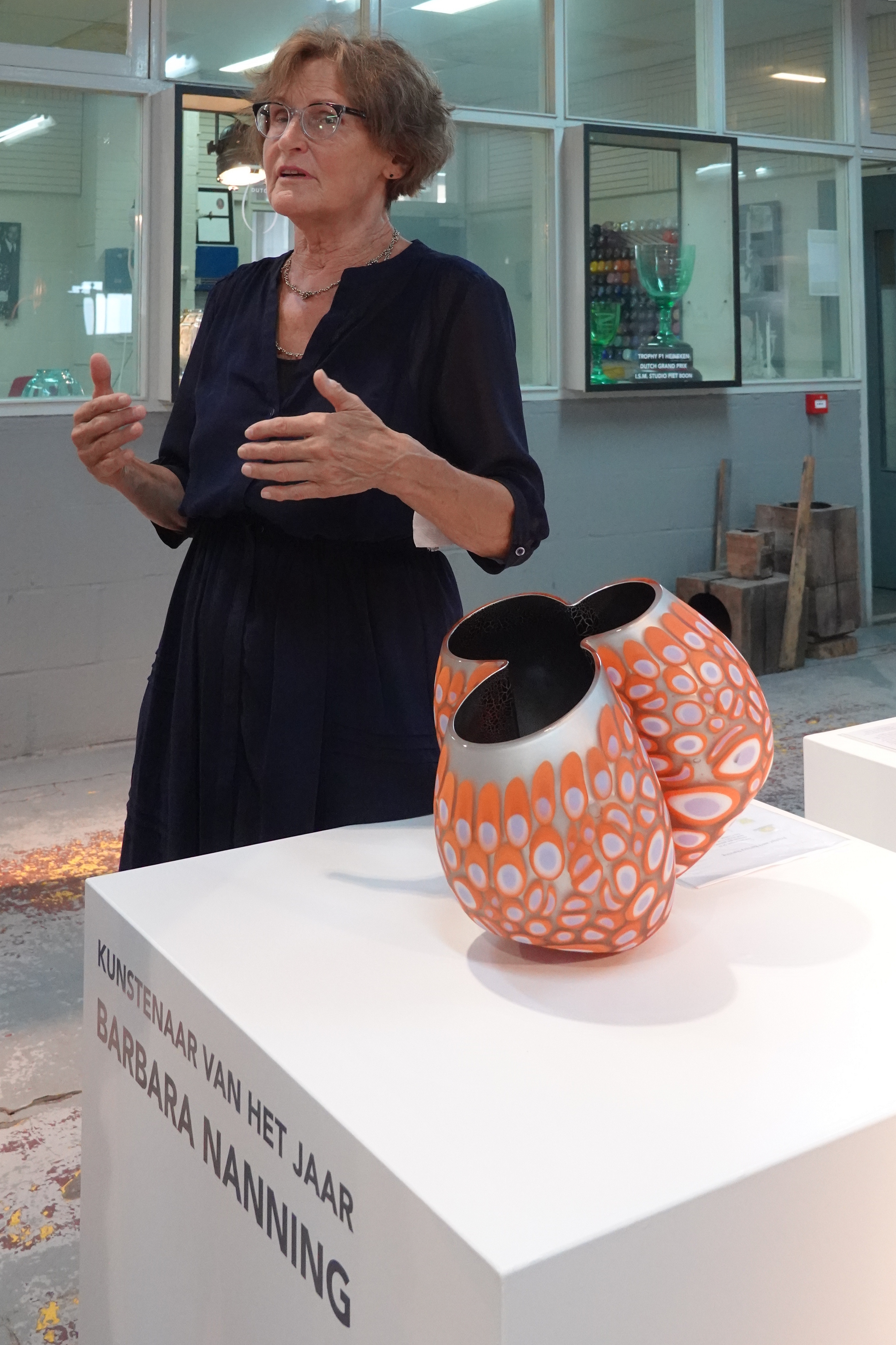
- Barbara Nanning in 2023
- Born: January 3, 1957 (age 69); Den Haag

Barbara Nanning (born January 3, 1957, The Hague, The Netherlands) is a Dutch designer, sculptor, monumental artist, ceramist and glass artist.

== Education ==
Nanning studied at the Gerrit Rietveld Academy from 1974 to 1979 under Jan van der Vaart, department of Ceramic Design. During her training, Nanning completed an internship with the potter Pierre Mestre in La Borne, France. In 1978, Nanning completed a second internship with Harry op de Laak in the department of Monumental Design at the Rijksacademie van Beeldende Kunsten in Amsterdam.

== Work ==
From 1978 to 1985, Nanning worked from her studio home at the Amsterdam Chasséstraat. From 1978 to 1980, she shared this studio with ceramicist Geert Lap. Since 1985, Nanning has been working in her studio at WG-Plein 21 in Amsterdam. Since 2001, Nanning also has a showroom there (WG-Plein 65). Her work can be found worldwide in the collections of 62 museums spread over 16 countries (including Museum of Fine Arts, Boston, Musée des Arts Décoratifs (Paris), Stedelijk Museum Amsterdam, Design Museum Gent, Metropolitan Museum Seoul, and in private collections of Airbus, Fundación Picasso and Mimi and Bill Gates Sr. among others).

== Ceramics ==
Nanning began her career as a ceramicist. She emphasized applying color to turned pots in her work, drawing on the color theory of the Bauhaus. Inspiration also came from the shapes of the bowls and platters made by the original inhabitants of Mexico, as well as being influenced by the bright colors of textiles and plastic utensils from Mexico. She made bowls and vases adding colored Mexican yarns as decorative or constructive elements.

Autonomous ceramic objects arose from the bowl shapes, which she called 'Fossiele vormen' ['Fossil forms']. During a study trip to Cappadocia, Turkey, Nanning gained inspiration for works in fired stoneware clay. She made unglazed, twisted pot and vase forms that were wrapped with string. Bulges formed between the constrictions.

In 1990 she created the series 'Galaxy', which she showed at the Dutch event 'Keramiek '90'. In this series, Nanning did not use glazes and engobes, but pure paint pigments. This technique not only made the kiln unnecessary, but also allowed her to start using painterly colors for ceramics, without the color reflecting as with glossy glazes. Although this made all colors available, Nanning chose a limited palette of pure, unmixed pigments. She mixed these pigments with fine sand to soften the contours of her objects. The rotations in her objects reveal Nanning's fascination with perpetual motion. 'Galaxy' earned Nanning the Ceramics '90 award, and an invitation to participate in the 1991 International Exhibition of Contemporary Ceramics in Shigaraki, Japan.

Foreign trips, particularly to Japan, laid the foundation for Nannings' work. In Japan - and particularly in the dozens of small, stylized Zen gardens - she drew inspiration for bowls with parallel grooves and gnarled objects made of petrified wood with ceramic components in the 'Terra' series. In her work, Nanning strives for the sublime of stillness; a perfect finish, the omission of the superfluous and the serenity to get it right. A balance and harmony between the static and the dynamic, between growth and gravity.

Some single objects inspired by flower buds and seed capsules around 1996 developed into the series of objects in monochromatic colors 'Botanica'.

== Monumental ==
In 1982, Nanning received her first monumental commission. For a social housing complex on the 'Ceramplein' in Amsterdam, she designed a wall with incorporated seating element made of glazed bricks for the building's entrance portal. At the end of the 1980s, Nanning made her first sculptures for public spaces from ceramic objects that became increasingly larger. For example, she made the sculpture 'Rotations I', measuring 170 x 200 cm, for Rijksmuseum Twenthe. Three years later, commissioned by the municipality of Amsterdam, Nanning made 'Draaiingen II' for the campus of the Vrije Universiteit's main faculty. With architect Paul van Leeuwen, Nanning designed in CAD / CAM the monument to Mt. Fuji volcano. Thanks to the digital script with all the benchmarks, the 'Monument to Mt. Fuji Volcano: Petrified Dynamic Flow', was then made in Japan and placed in Gotemba City, Japan in 2007.

Monumental commissions for public spaces in Aalsmeer en in Driebergen, and in Wako City, Saitama, followed in 1997. In 2002 and 2003, Nanning made an installation of flowers, 'Fleurs de Mer I-II' in polyurethane, gilded with gold leaf, decorating the ceilings of the dining rooms in the cruise ships ms Zuiderdam and ms Oosterdam of the Holland-America Line. Commissioned by the Board of Directors of ABN AMRO Bank, Nanning created the flowers 'Seres', inspired by lush leaves that seem to sway in the wind. For these flowers, she experimented with the still soft material that she prematurely removed from the molds.

In 2010, Nanning designed 24 windows in a residential building on the Ruyterstraat in Huizen. As the basis for the various burned-in colorful 'float' windows, Nanning made small fusing glass sheets, which she then processed by computer. The float windows were manufactured in the (then new) SGG CREA-LITE COLOR decorative technique.

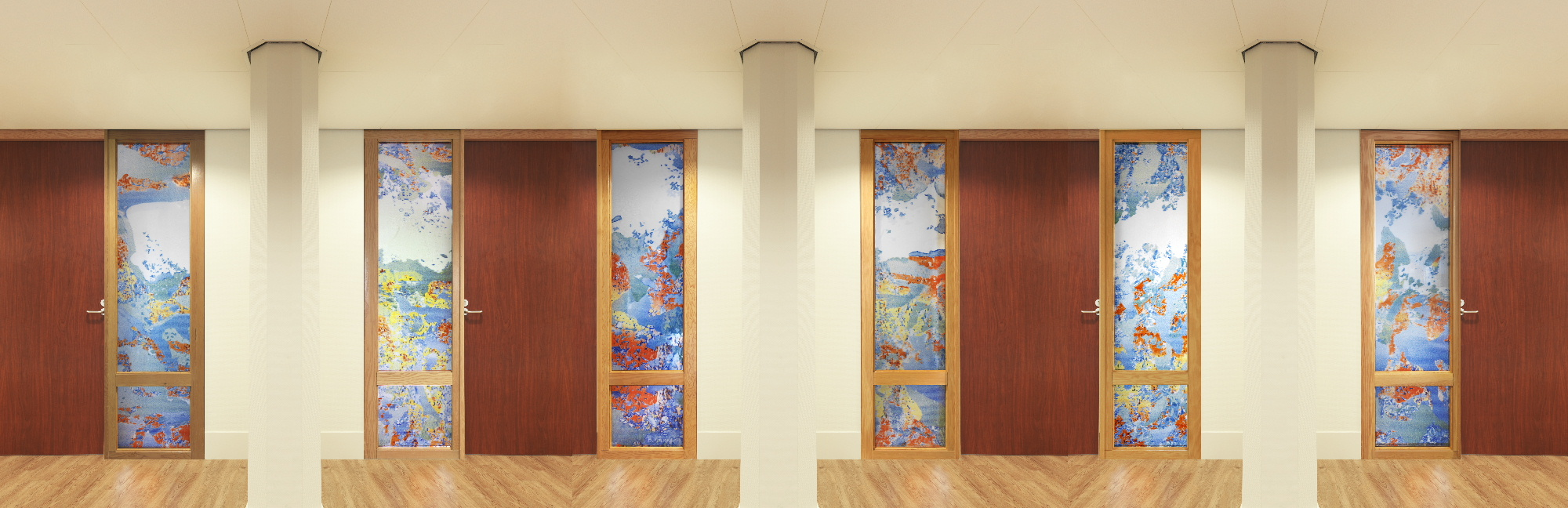
Barbara Nanning, 'Hemel' [Sky], Windows for residential building Huizen, 2010.

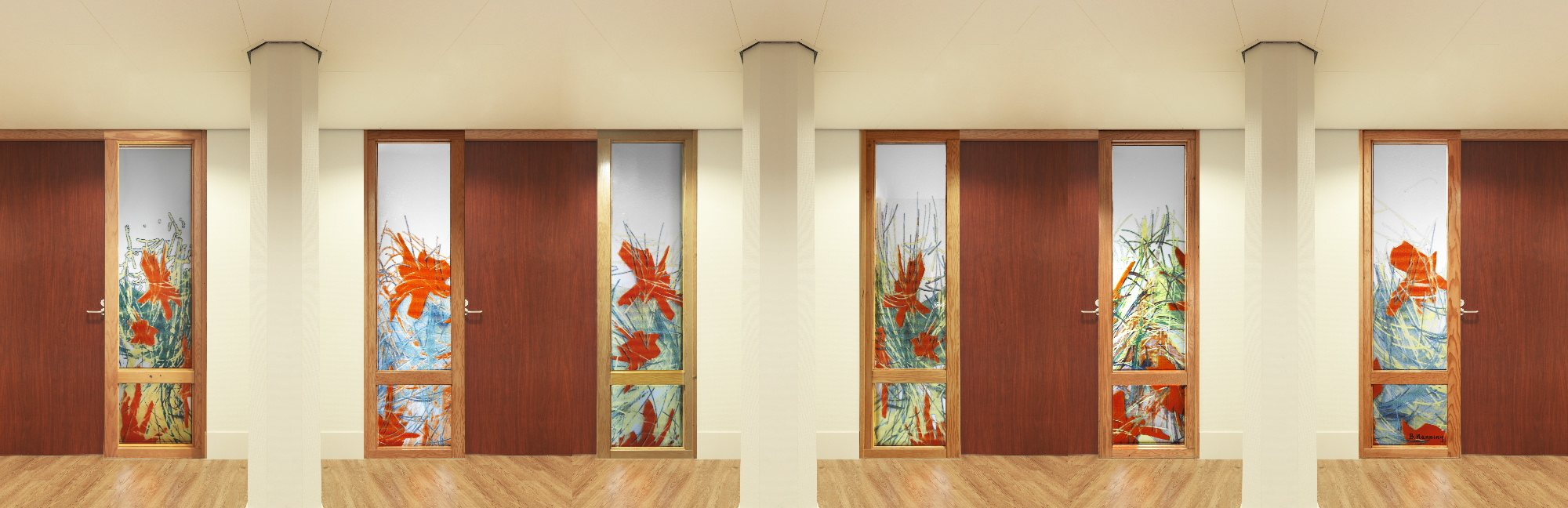
Barbara Nanning, 'Aarde' [Earth], Windows for residential building Huizen, 2010.

== Glass ==
At the invitation of the National Glass Museum and the Royal Leerdam Glass Factory, Nanning worked with glass for the first time in 1994. She made blown objects that were reshaped by sawing them and then grinding and polishing them. Nanning worked at Royal Leerdam, the Glascentrum Leerdam, the Amsterdam glass studio Van Tetterode and Vrij Glas in Zaanstad, focusing more and more on working with glass.

Since 2001, Nanning has been carrying out her glass designs at glassmaking studio Ajeto in Lindava, Czech Republic. In this workshop, Nanning can work with multiple layers of color and, under her watchful eye, lobed shapes are blown, cut, polished and sandblasted. Several worlds are united in Nannings glass objects. Her imagery is based on classical Bohemian cut glass, decorative Japanese floral motifs, modern optical cut glass, nature and crystallography. She uses the verre églomisé technique and collaborates with gilder Václav Novák, conservator Vlastivědné muzeum a galerie Česká Lípa, Czech Republic, for this purpose. The name Verre églomisé comes from Frenchman Jean-Baptiste Glomy who revived this ancient technique.

Nanning starts each unique object from a circle, which she calls the basic shape in nature. From there the movement comes and the form is determined. It often comes from experiments with pâte de verre, glass fusing, glassblowing and gilding. In photographs, sketches and drawings, Nanning records her inspiration. From a fascination with form, structure and geometry, she studies crystals, jellyfish, flowers and microorganisms. In her work, she seeks the contrast between order and chaos, hard and soft, rigid and supple. After form follows color.

Nanning works not only with blown glass, but also with fused flat glass. She incorporates these as windows in her monumental commissions. She also made cabinets with decorative glass panels in intensive collaboration with the Amsterdam furniture maker Godfried Brands. The spirit of the Bauhaus, where intensive interaction between artists of different disciplines in their studios and craftsmen in their workshops served the final product, continued in this collaboration.

In her work process, Nanning unites classical craft with experimentation and innovative use of materials. With research organization TNO and companies such as Polarttech and Hyperlast, Nanning collaborated to develop new materials.

The installation 'Eternal Spring' consists of glass-blown and hand-formed snow-white branches protruding from wall, table and floor objects, from knots of pollarded willows or from corals. With the gilded bouquets, Nanning translates the baroque design of the eighteenth century into a twenty-first contemporary design language. In the series 'Gekleurde schaduwen' ['Colored Shadows'], Nanning draws with glass, drawing along with the form. Here she applies the age-old Murrine technique in a completely unique way. Drawing glass threads composed of multiple layers of color is all about drawing and variety. Whimsicality and size evoke an image of cell division in nature. The colors lie on top of each other like thin layers and fold into the blown-out curves; they seem to detach from each other like Colored Shadows. Form and color become a still life.

In 2020, in close collaboration with Czech grinder Aleš Zvěřina, Nanning launched the Chimaera series, for which she uses alexandrite and uranium glass. With saw cuts and polished facets, she brought depth and optical effects to the objects.

In her series 'Byzantium', Nanning drew inspiration from the grandiose color splendor of Byzantine mosaics. The painter Gustav Klimt gave it his own interpretation in the early 20th century, when he created the Stoclet frieze in the dining room of Palais Stoclet in Brussels. Nanning translates the reinterpretation of the Byzantine mosaics by gilding open spaces between the glass canes with 23.5 carats of gold leaf, so that its forms now display an unprecedented richness.

UNESCO declared the year 2022 as the United Nations International Year of Glass (IYOG2022). In this year, Barbara Nanning was elected Dutch Artist of the Year making her the first glass artist to receive this honorary title.

== Works (selection) ==
- 2008 Nautilus, IJburg
- 2007 Petrified Dynamic Flows (Mt.Fuji monument) in Gotenba
- 2004 Vis-à-Vis, Wako City, Saitama, Japan
- 2002-2003 Fleurs de Mer I – II, ms. Zuiderdam en ms. Oosterdam
- 2001 Ramen, Uitvaartcentrum Daelwijck, Utrecht
- 1999 Bloemknoppen, bij het KLPD [nu: Landelijke Eenheid van de Nationale Politie] in Driebergen
- 1999 Galaxy, TNO/TPD, Eindhoven
- 1997 Liggende bloem, Aalsmeer
- 1992 Infinite Movement, Vrije Universiteit, Amsterdam

== Solo exhibitions (selection) ==
- 2022-2023 Museum JAN, 'Barbara Nanning. Bewogen verstilling'
- 2019 Kunstmuseum, ‘Barbara Nanning. Eeuwige Beweging’
- 2016 Museum Rijswijk, ‘Barbara Nanning. Gekleurde Schaduwen in Glas’, 2016
- 2012 Design Museum Gent, ‘Barbara Nanning. Eeuwige Lente’
- 2011 Glasmuseum Alter Hof Herding, Coesfeld, ‘Barbara Nanning. Ewiger Frühling – Eternal Spring’
- 2003 Singer Laren, ‘Barbara Nanning. Evolution’
- 2001 Nationaal Glasmuseum Leerdam, ‘Barbara Nanning. Fleurs de Verre’
- 1993 Stedelijk Museum Amsterdam, 'Barbara Nanning. Terra. Reizen in tijd en ruimte'

== Books ==
- Titus Eliëns, Barbara Nanning – Eeuwige beweging. Keramiek, installaties en glaskunst [Dutch edition], Zwolle 2019. ISBN 9789462622555
- Titus Eliëns, Barbara Nanning – Eternal Movement. Ceramics, Installations and Glass Art [English edition], Zwolle 2019. ISBN 9789462622562
- Thimo te Duits, Barbara Nanning, Barbara nanning_evolution [Dutch, English and Japanese edition], Amsterdam 2003. ISBN 9090173692
- Liesbeth Crommelin, Paul Donker-Duyvis, Barbara Nanning, Galaxy & Terra, Ceramics - Reizen in tijd en ruimte [Dutch and English edition], Amsterdam 1993. ISBN 9066171065

== See also ==
- List of Dutch sculptors
- List of Dutch ceramists
- Category Glaskunst of Wikimedia Commons for media files on this subject
