= Princessehof Ceramics Museum =

- Keramiekmuseum Princessehof
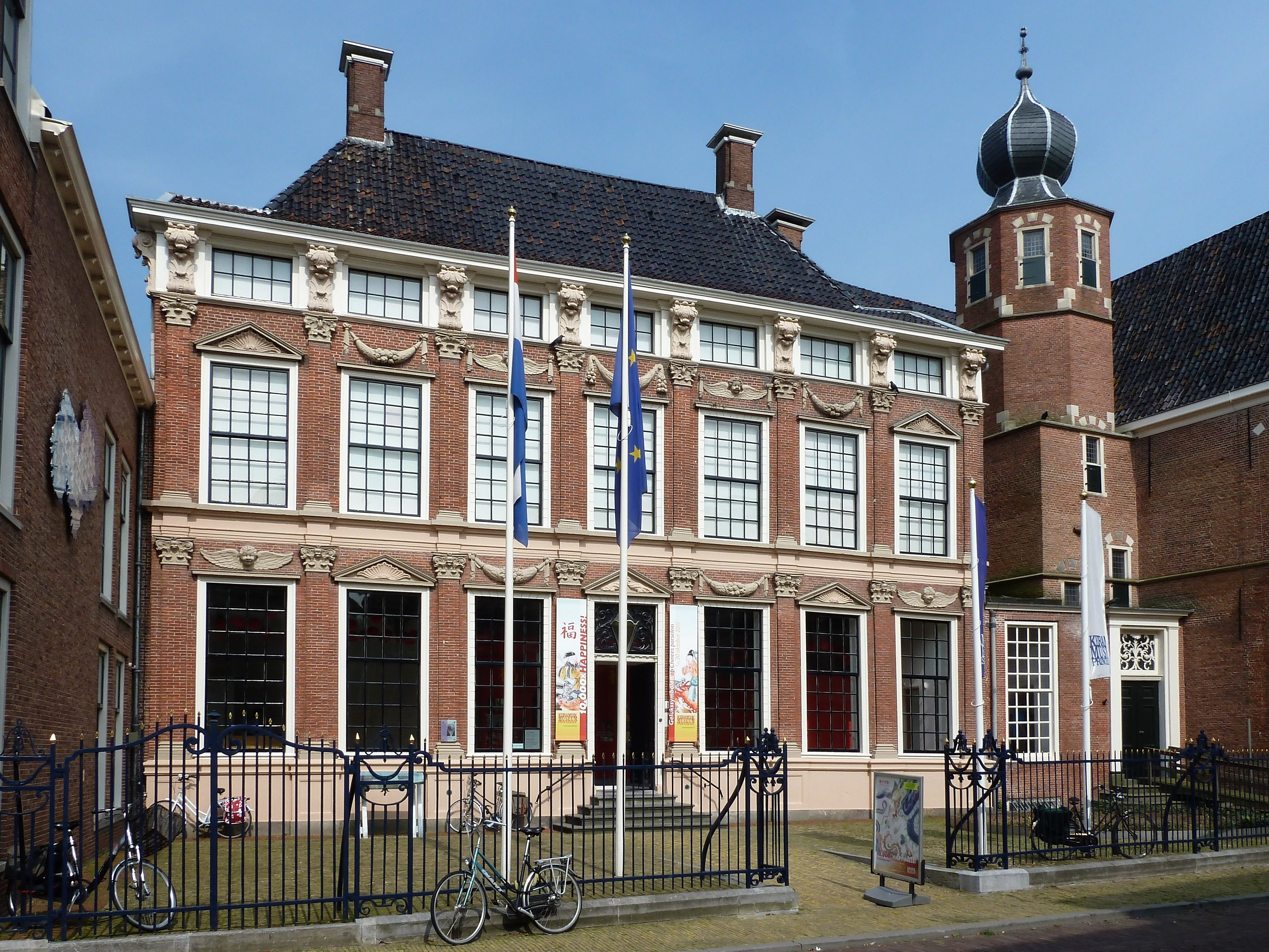
- Princessehof Ceramics Museum
- Established: 1917
- Location: Grote Kerkstraat 9 Leeuwarden, Netherlands
- Coordinates: 53°12′10.76″N 5°47′31.72″E
- Type: Art museum
- Collections: Ceramic art
- President: Saskia Bak
- Curators: Frank van der Velden, Eva Ströber, Karin Gaillard
- Website: www.princessehof.nl

The Princessehof Ceramics Museum (in Dutch: Keramiekmuseum Princessehof) is a museum of ceramics in the city of Leeuwarden in the Netherlands. The museum's name comes from one of two buildings in which it is housed: a small palace (hof means ‘royal court’) built in 1693 and later occupied by Marie Louise, dowager Princess of Orange. The other annexed building is the Papinga stins, a former stronghold from the 15th century. The museum buildings are of interest, and so are its collection of tiles, pottery, and ceramic sculpture.

On Monday morning, 13 Feb 2023, someone broke into the museum and stole eleven "precious Chinese ceramics". Seven of the pieces were destroyed as the thieves made their escape, but four others are unaccounted for. The heist came less than two weeks after a failed break-in attempt at the museum.

== History of the building ==
In 1731, the building was purchased by Marie Louise (known in Leeuwarden as Marijke Meu, 'Aunt Mary'), who had been a widow since 1711 and acted as regent for her son William IV up to that year, when he came of age. She moved in and began a collection of ceramics, and her collection forms part of the museum's collection, most notably in the Nassaukamer, a period dining room in Baroque style. After she died, the building was split into three houses, and one of these later came into the hands of the Leeuwarden notary and art collectors Nanne Ottema (1874–1955) and his wife Grietje Kingma, who founded the museum during their lifetime in 1917.

The Dutch graphic artist M.C. Escher, known for his often mathematically inspired woodcuts, lithographs, and mezzotints, was born in the middle house in 1898.

== Ceramics ==
The Ottema-Kingma Stichting (foundation) keeps the tradition of the founders alive with an online database for the collection and associated library. This Stichting is also the formal owner of the Asian ceramics collection, with items ranging from 2800 BC up to the 20th century. Besides the Asian collection, there is also a wide range of European and some Islamic ceramics.

== Facilities ==
The museum has a café and often hosts visiting art exhibitions. The museum also permanently exhibits the former studio of the Dutch ceramist Jan van der Vaart.

== Gallery ==
Selection of work from the pertinent collection:

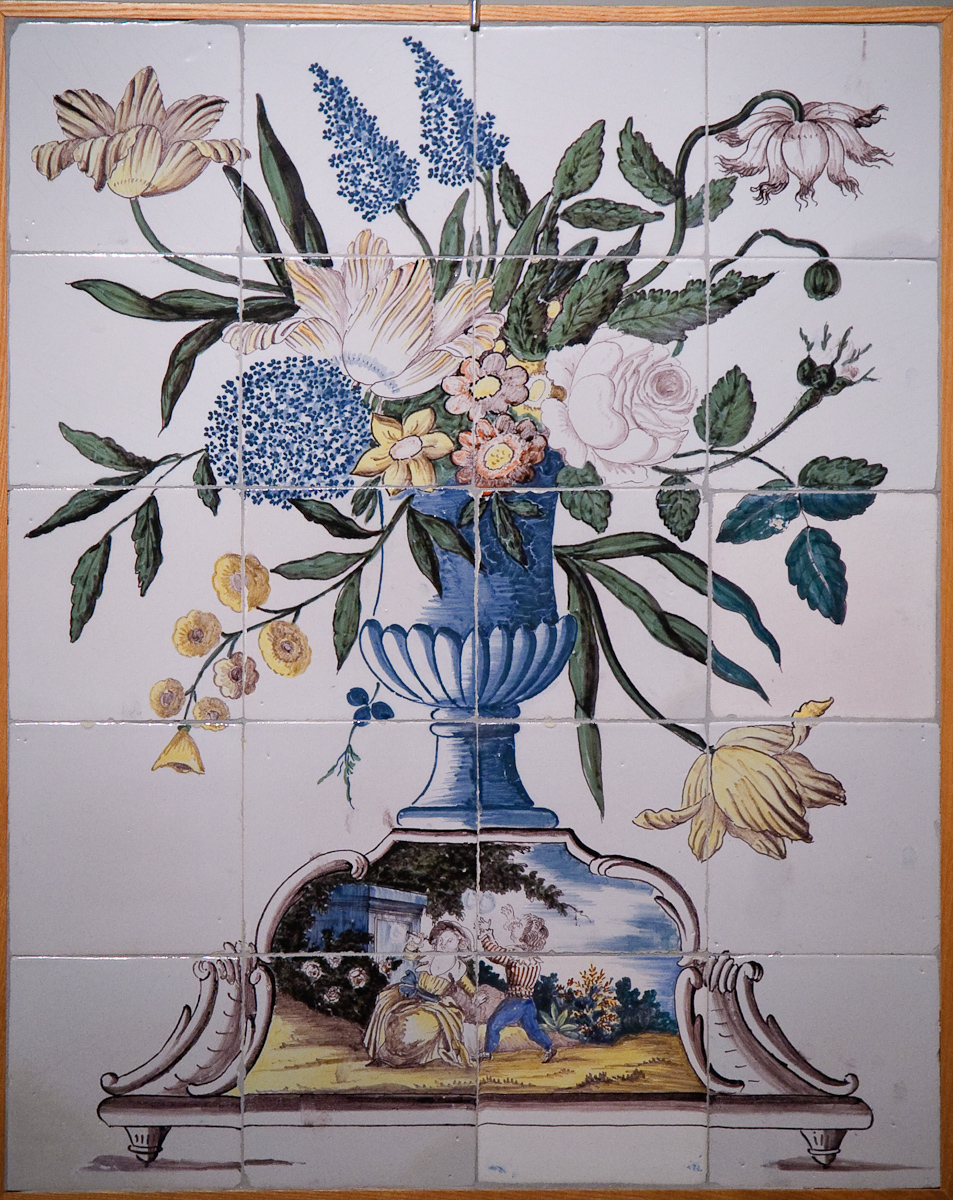
Tile flower painting

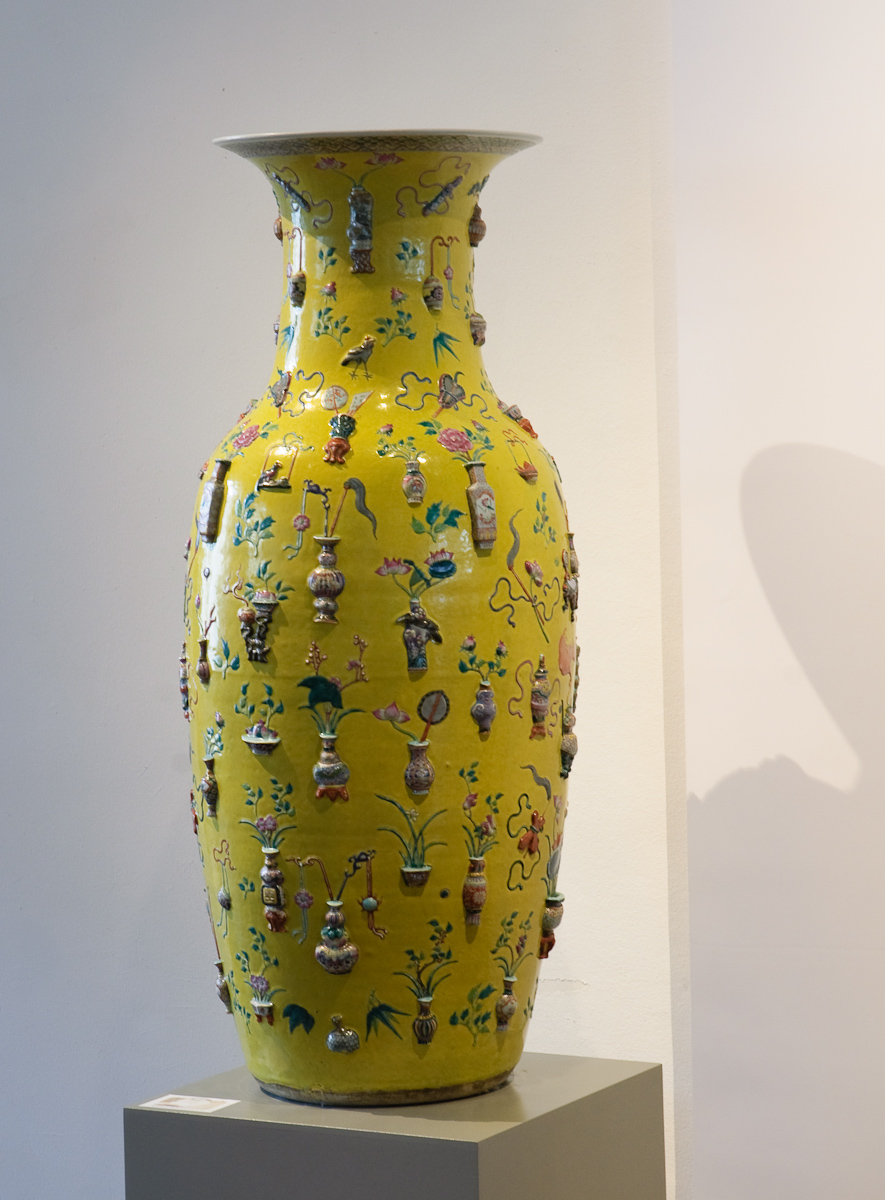
Yellow vase

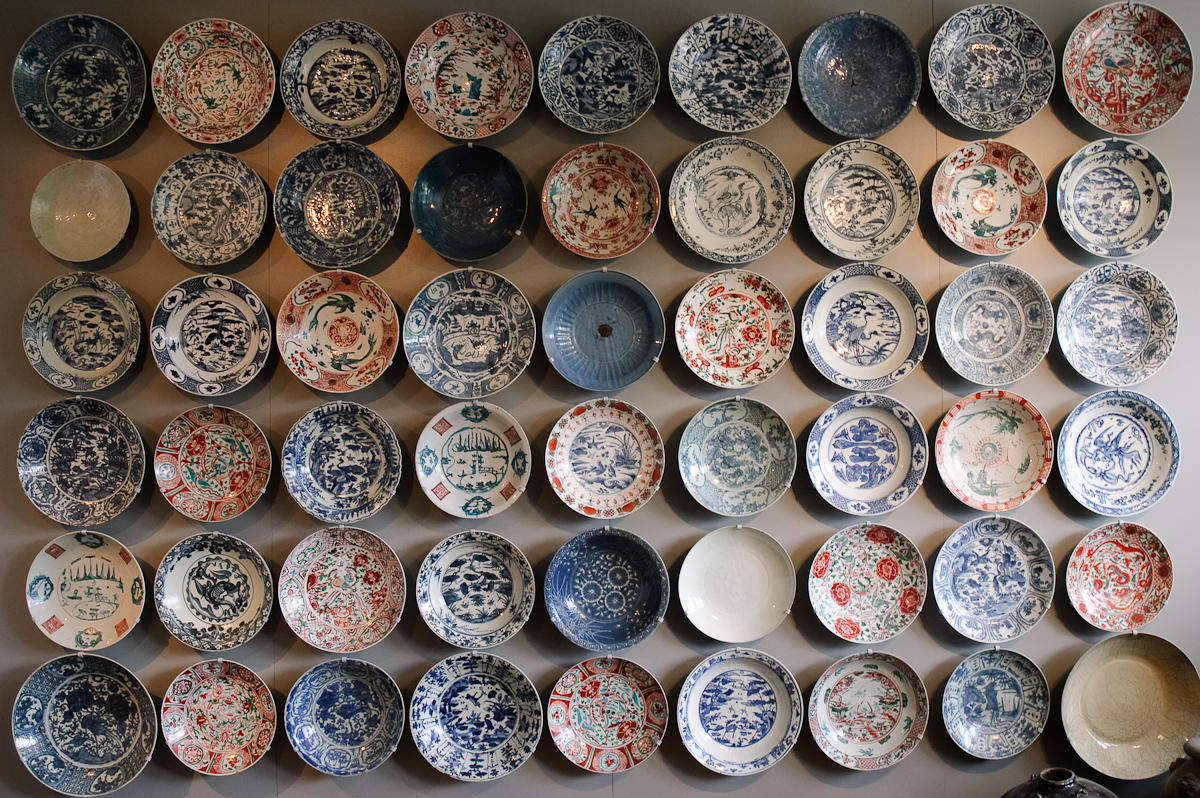
Wall of Chinese Zhangzhou ware plates

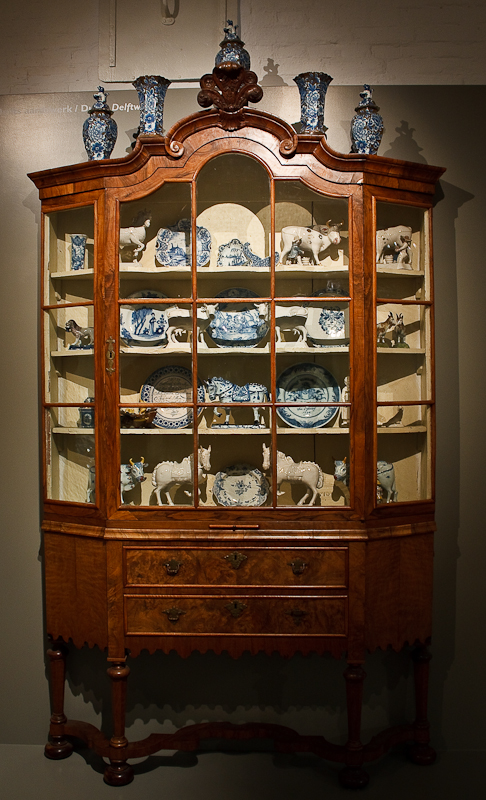
Delftware

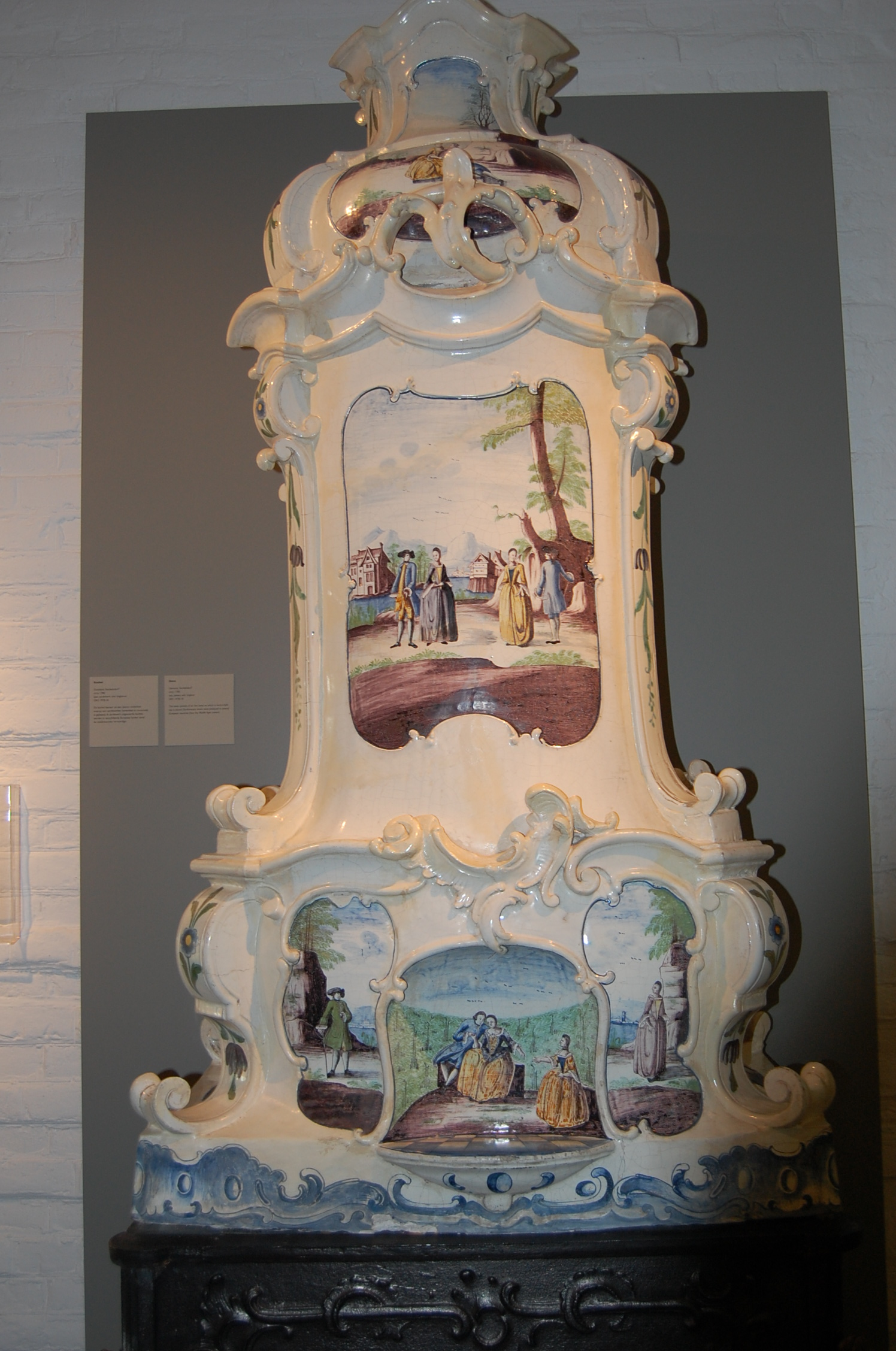
Mantelpiece

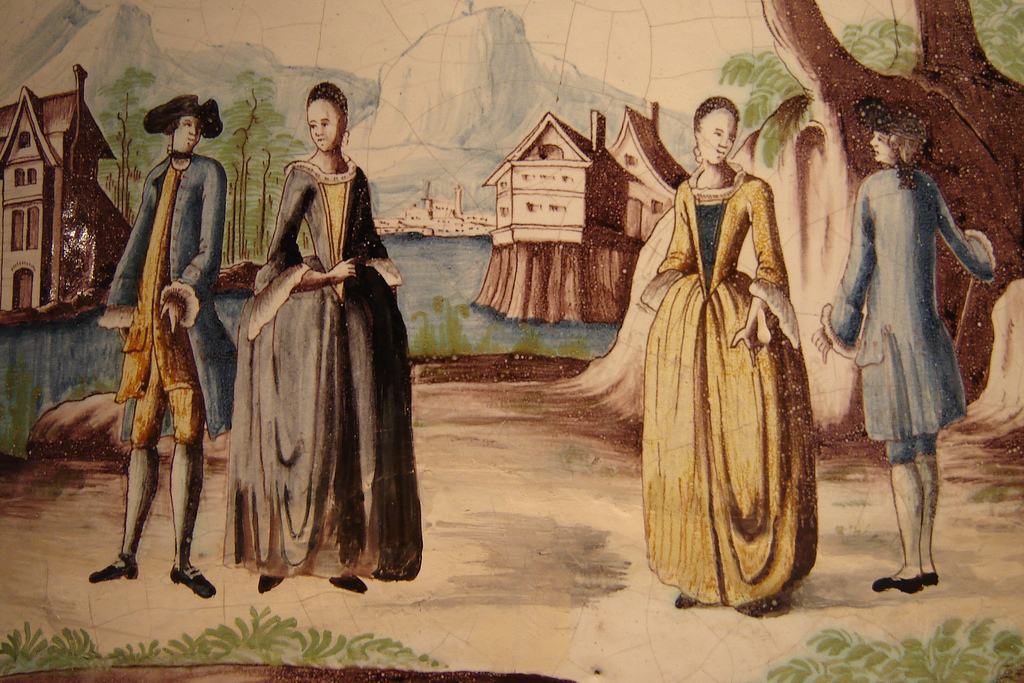
Porcelain painting on a mantelpiece
