= Lies Cosijn =

Dutch ceramist

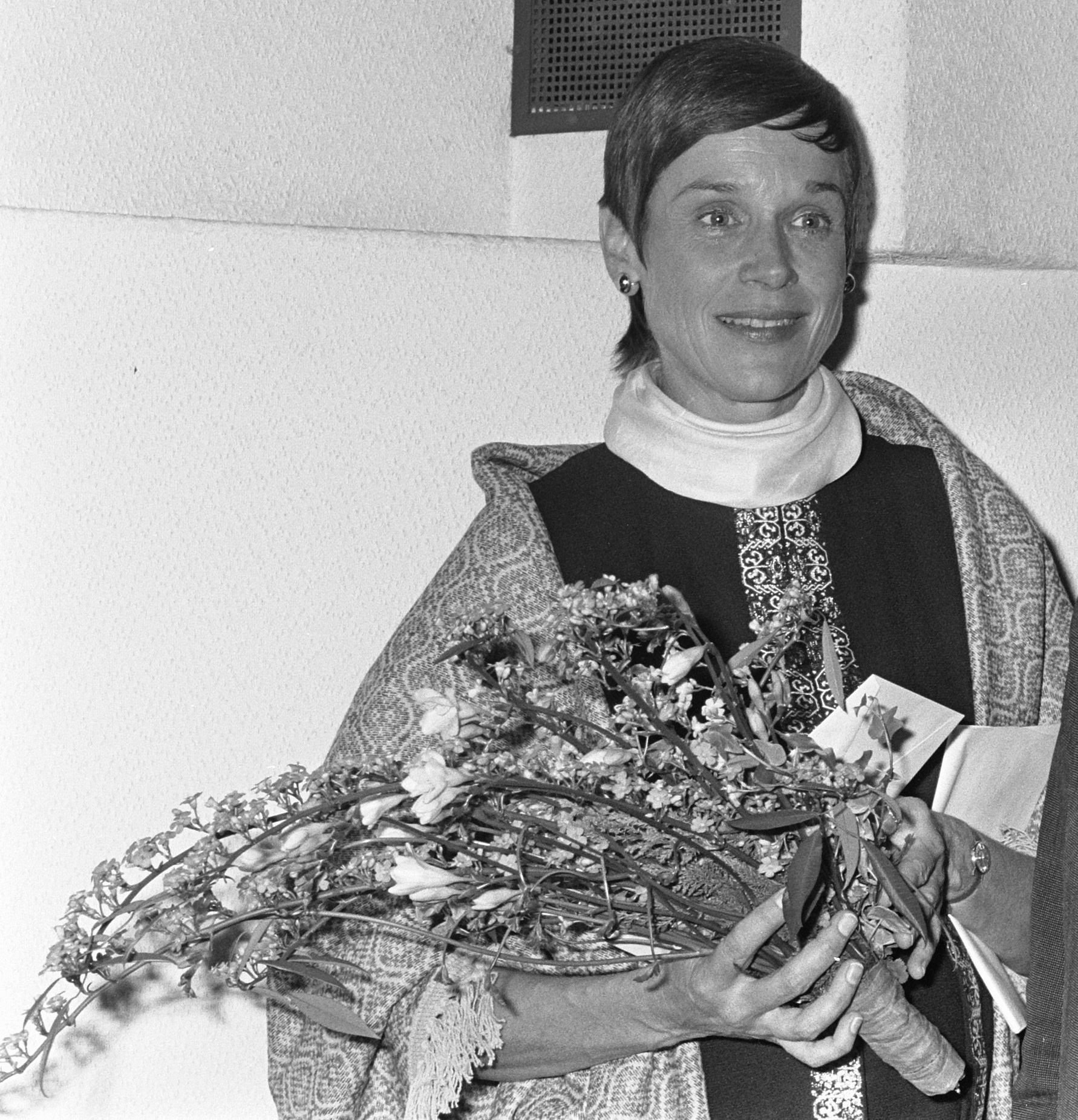
David Röell Award presented to Lies Meijers-Cosijn in the Rijksmuseum, 1972

Alida "Lies" Meijers-Cosijn (25 April 1931 – 23 February 2016, Petten) was a Dutch ceramist. Her work is described as "fairytale like and poetic, but also sometimes bizarre and realistic."

== Life and work ==
Born in Mojokerto, Cosijn returned with her family to The Netherlands in 1946. After attending the a girls secondary school, she studied ceramics at the Institute of Applied Art in Amsterdam under Theo Dobbelman and Willem de Vries from 1951 to 1955.

In 1956 she started her career as ceramist at the De Koninklijke Porceleyne Fles as assistant in the Experimental Division. In 1957 she married Herman Meijers (1923–2000), Professor of International Law at the University of Amsterdam, and she started her own studio at the Kloveniersburgwal in Amsterdam in 1963 but moved to Petten, North Holland the next year. After the years 1969-1970 in Jamaica, Cosijn and Meijers returned to Petten. Cosijn made "stoneware clay by hand, then engraves the decor in sinter slips and bakes her work in an electric furnace to about 1160 degrees."

According to Breitbarth (2009) Cosijn always "deliberately pushed the boundaries, to explore them, to try and possibly to circumvent a ruse. In her work frontiers where crossed numerous times. For example between the two-dimensional character of the drawing and the three-dimensional data of the bowl. Or when drawing the ribs meet at a polygonal box and thus forced the corner store. Also, the creation of space is a game with the limitation: it can literally by making a hole in the wall of the bowl, but also by drawing a window, door or curtain and so as to suggest a see-through." In 1972 she was awarded the David Röell Award.

== Gallery ==
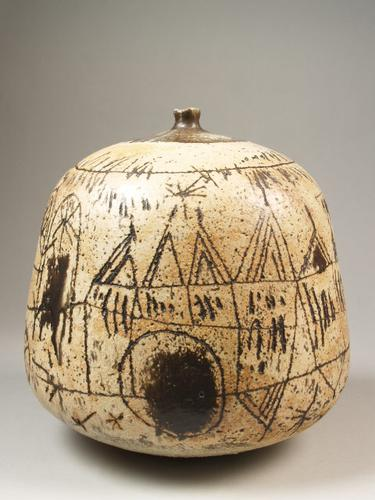
Vase with incised figurative decor of landscape with buildings, 1956-62

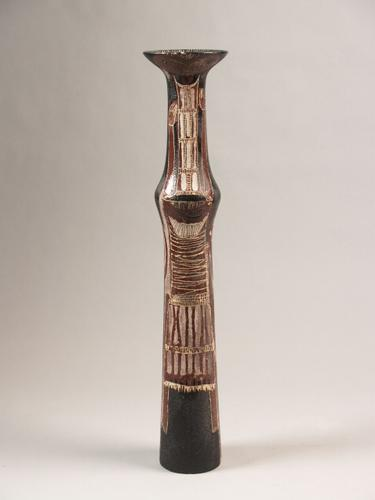
Candle Holder with decor of elongated humans and animals, 1957-62

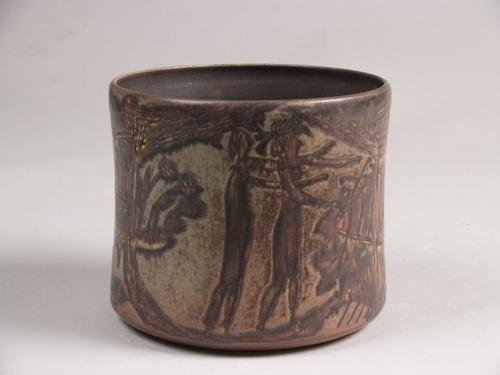
Autism pot 1959

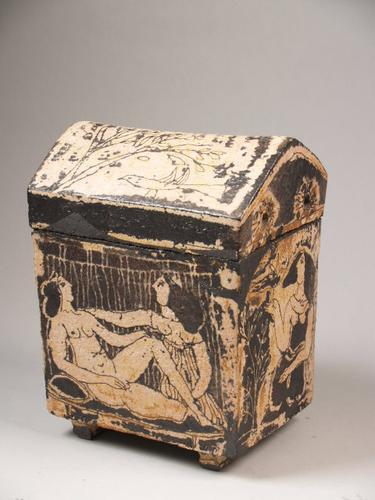
Love box, 1976

== Selected publications ==
- Museum Boymans Van Beuningen., & Gemeentemuseum Arnhem. (1973). Catalogus van de tentoonstelling Lies Cosijn, keramiek 1956-1973, inbegrepen de potterie gemaakt op de Experimentele Afdeling van de Porceleyne Fles te Delft, in samenwerking met Jet Sielcken, Adriek Westenenk en Natasha Zaludova, Museum Boymans-van Beuningen Rotterdam, 13 oktober-26 november 1973: Gemeentemuseum Arnhem, 1 december 1973-13 januari 1974. Rotterdam.
- Lies Cosijn, Dorris Kuyken-Schneider. Compassion and Poetry: Ceramics of Lies Cosijn/Compassie en Poezie: Ceramiek van Lies Cosijn. 2002

== See also ==
- List of Dutch ceramists
