= Theo Dobbelman =

Dutch sculptor, ceramist and painter (1906–1984)

- Born: Theodorus Antonius Hubertus Maria Dobbelman; 22 October 1906; Nijmegen
- Died: Montalivet-les-Bains, France
- Education: Academie Minerva; De Koninklijke Porceleyne Fles
- Known for: Ceramics

Theodorus Antonius Hubertus Maria (Theo) Dobbelman (Nijmegen, 22 October 1906 – Montalivet-les-Bains, France, 7 September 1984) was a Dutch sculptor, ceramist and painter.

Dobbelman came into prominence as ceramist and leader of the experimental division of De Koninklijke Porceleyne Fles in Delft since 1956. He also taught at the Royal Academy of Fine Arts in Amsterdam.

== Biography ==
=== Early life ===
Dobbelman (also: Dobbelmann) was the son of soap maker and politician Pierre Dobbelmann. He initially studied chemistry at the Swiss Fribourg, where he also graduated. He settled in Amsterdam, where he befriended ceramist Just van Deventer.

From 1941 he worked with him in his company Tanagra Pottery. After the Second World War Dobbelman left the business, and he worked as an independent artist. In 1956 he became the leader of an experimental division of De Koninklijke Porceleyne Fles in Delft. The department focused on the renewal of ceramics as art form. Early pupils out there were Lies Cosijn and Jet Sielcken. One of the latest pupils out there was Simone Haak.

=== Later career ===
Dobbelman taught ceramics associated with the Institute of Applied Art and the Royal Academy of Fine Arts, both in Amsterdam. His students included Frank van Brakel,, Hannie Mein, Francine Timmers, and Jan van der Vaart. He was president of Saint Luke Artist Association and member of Arti et Amicitiae.

Later in his life he was invested as a Knight of the Order of Orange-Nassau. Dobbelman died in France and was buried on cemetery Zorgvlied.

== Work ==
Over the years Dobbelman contributed with numerous designs for ceramics, bronze and terra cotta, and to publications, commissions and illustrations. In 1976 the Princessehof Ceramics Museum in Leeuwarden contributed with a retrospective of his work.

=== Exhibitions, a selection ===
- 1948. Group exhibition in Arti, Arti et Amicitiae, Amsterdam.
- 1955. Sculptures in the Lijnbaan, Lijnbaan Rotterdam.
- 1959. De porseleyne fles ín Paríjs, Dutch Institute in Paris.
- 1965. Ceramic sculptures, indoor and outdoor, Museum Arnhem, Arnhem.

=== Works in the public space (selection) ===
- Heerhugowaard, Untitled (1980), Granaat-Smaragd (Garnet-Emerald), at school "The Aventurine"
- Veenendaal, Untitled (1968), a ceramic cube at the base Kerkwijk

=== Photo gallery ===
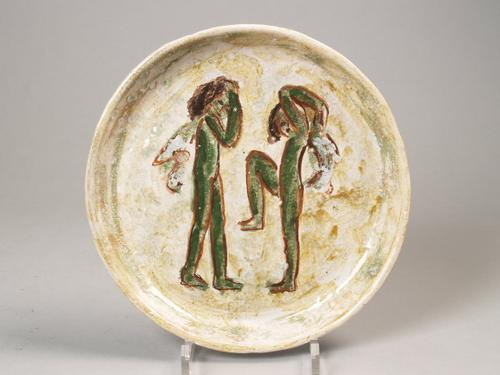
Flat bowl with raised edge (1949)

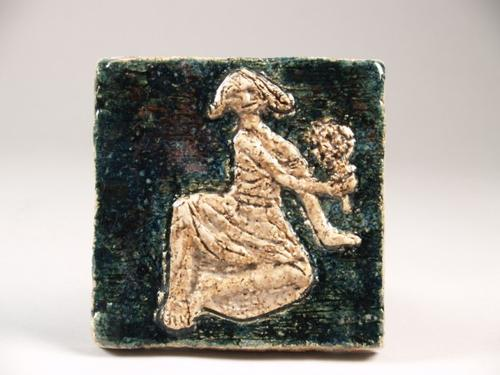
Tile with decor of sitting girl with mirror (1955)

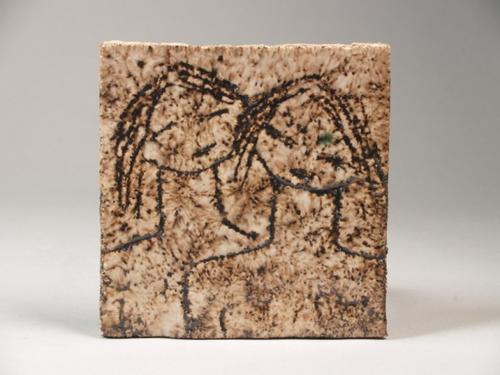
Tile with decor of two girl figures (1959)

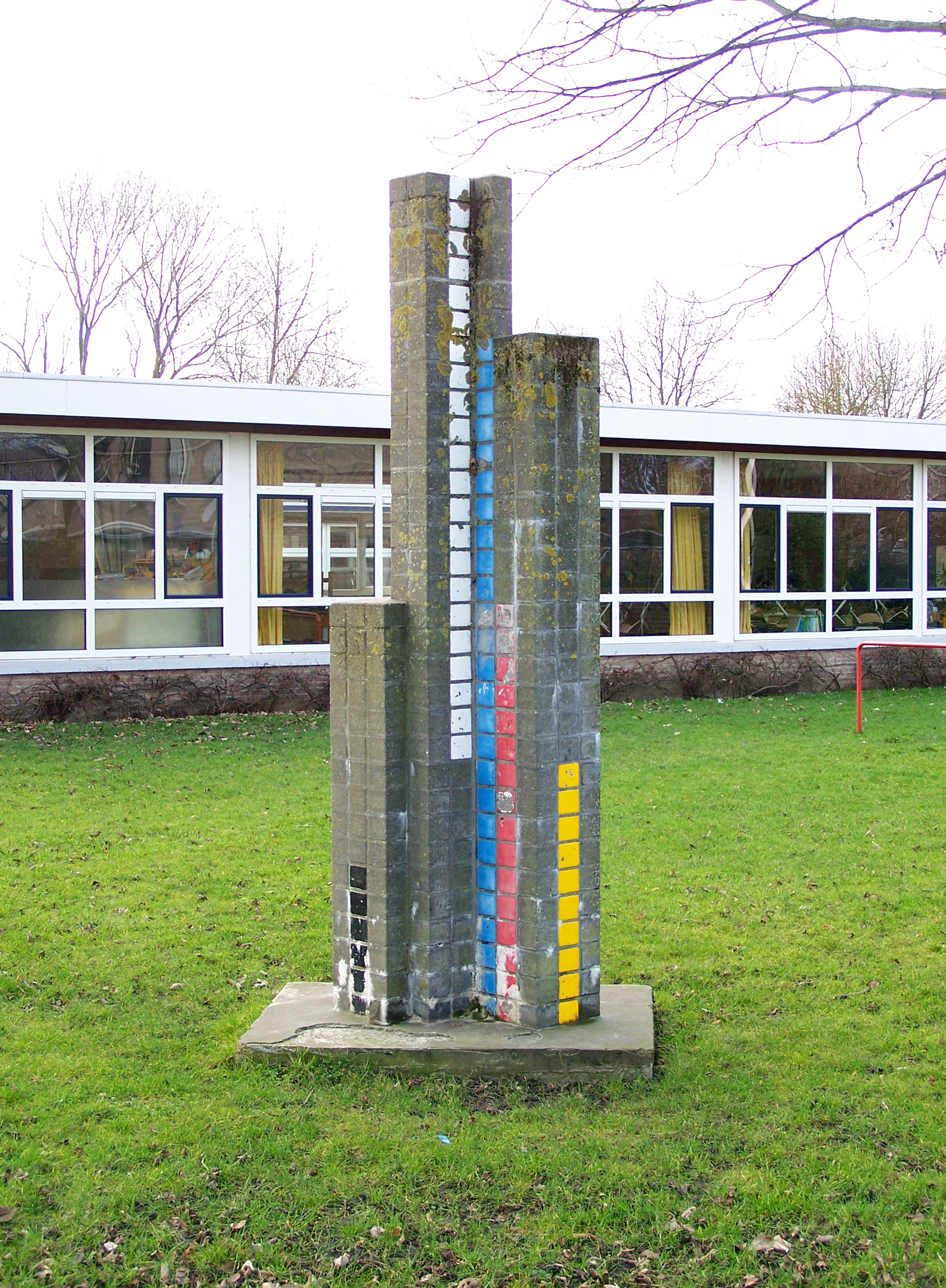
Without title (1980), Heerhugowaard

== See also ==
- List of Dutch ceramists
