= Gallery Terra Delft =

Ceramics art gallery in Delft, Netherlands

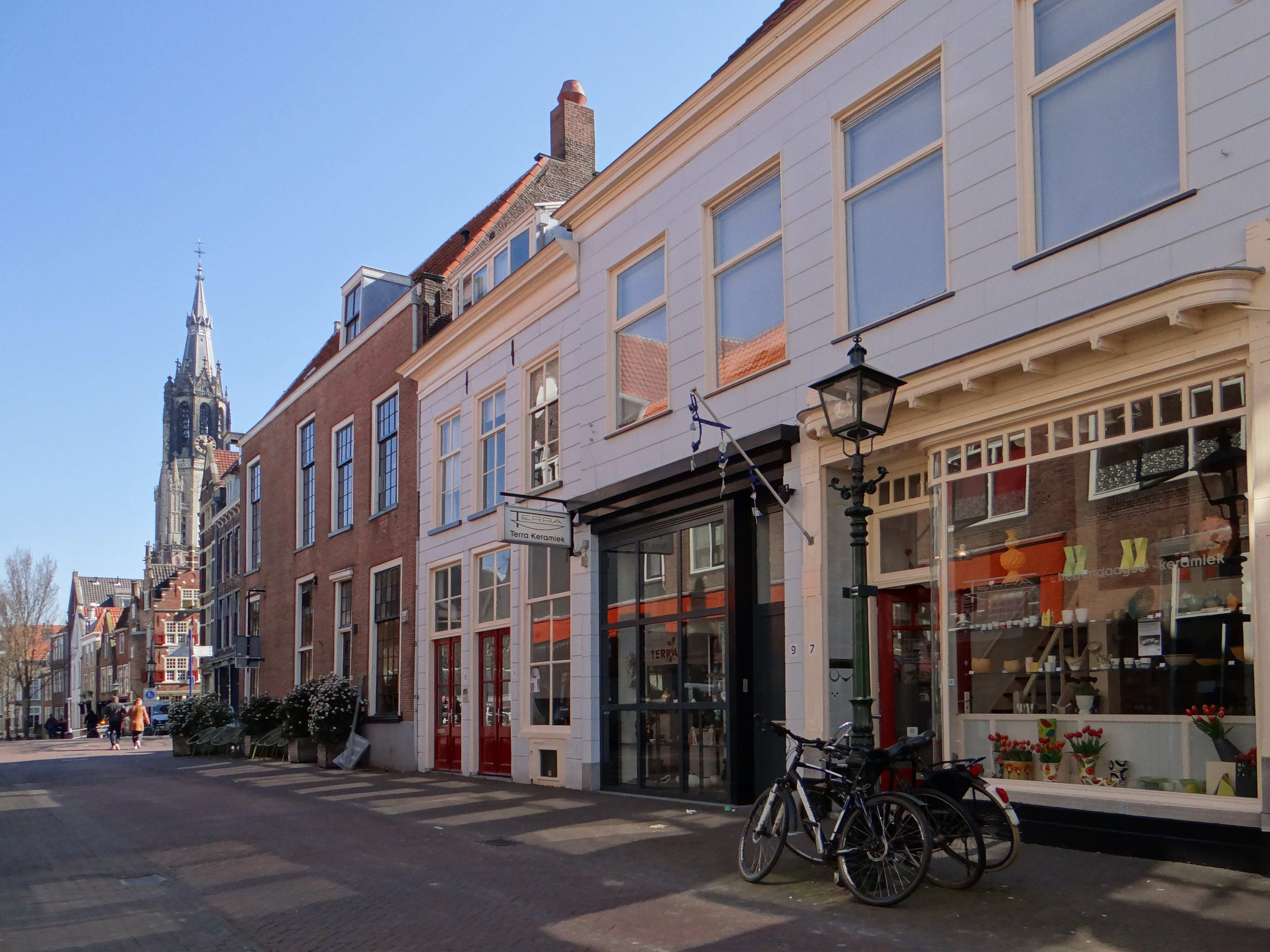
- Terra Keramiek Gallery, Nieuwstraat 7, Delft
- Origins: Founded in 1986
- Key people: Simone Haak & Joke Doedens (founders)
- Website: terra-delft.nl

Gallery Terra Delft is an art gallery in Delft specialized in ceramics and ceramic art from contemporary national and international ceramists. It was founded in 1986.

== History ==
=== Opening and first years ===
The gallery was founded by artist Simone Haak (1952) and Joke Doedens (1961) in 1986 to create new opportunity for ceramists on the Dutch market. High quality ceramic art and products were hard to find in the market, and there were no more than a handful of specialized galleries in those days.

The gallery introduced the exhibition concept to offer more than occasional solo exhibitions for artists every month. At Terra Gallery work remained in stock after the exhibitions. In the first decade they had work in stock from about thirty ceramists, among them Klaartje Kamermans, Hein Severijns, Susanne Silvertant, Norman Trapman and Eddy Varekamp.

The art gallery had started in 1986 in an patrician house at the Oude Delft, the eldest canal in Delft. After three years in 1989 it moved to a shop-premises in the Nieuwstraat, a side street between the Oude Delft and the Wijnhaven, where it would remain.

=== Later years at the Nieuwstraat ===
After the first decade an international exhibition was held at the Old Church of Delft presenting works of 65 national and international artists, including the German Horst Göbbels, the Danish Bodil Manz. From the Netherlands present, were the younger Mieke Everaet, Netty Janssens, Wietske van Leeuwen, Esther Stasse, and more settled ceramists such as Klaartje Kamermans and Marijke van Os.

For the first anniversary Marjan Unger wrote a book about the gallery and the exhibition, entitled Keramiek en Delft 1996 = Ceramics and Delft 1996. This was published by Terra Keramiek in 1996.

At the 25th anniversary in 2011 a ceramics festival was organized in Delft, entitled "Brandpunt Delft", in cooperation with Stichting Keramiek Promotion Delft. This exhibition was located in four different spaces; in Museum Prinsenhof Delft (the Masterpiece), Museum Paul Tétar van Elven (Cristal glazes), Old Church (Figuratives) and Galerie Terra Delft (Felicity Aylieff).

In 2016 the gallery celebrated their 30th anniversary. Over the years many ceramists from all over the country and abroad had been given the opportunity to exhibit their work in the old city of Delft. The gallery had also participated with their works in numerous art fairs, had given lectures and workshops, had published a small series of books, and had started an online web shop with much biographical information about the ceramists. The number of artists in stock had raised to over 100. In the year 2016 it published a magazine about their history, entitled Ceramics - The Story of Thirty Years Terra Delft Gallery, Terra 30 jaar, 1986-2016. During the celebration of the 30th anniversary of the Terra Delft Gallery the two gallery owners were awarded with the Municipality penning Delft. The Delft City Council provided the pace for the generation of great renown of Delft ceramics town at home and abroad.

In 2018 Galerie Terra Delft published a book the life and work of the ceramist Dirk Romijn (1946-2017).

=== Exhibitions, a selection ===
- 1996. 10 jaar galerie Terra in the Old Church of Delft.
- 2002. Ross Emerson New clocks, vases and bowls
- 2005. Tjok Dessauvage, ceramics, unica.
- 2005. Julian Stair
- 2005. Dark Days of Delft
- 2006. Swedish Contemporary Ceramics, with works of Karin Östberg, Jussi Ojala, Jennifer Forsberg and Eva Zethraeus.
- 2011. Brandpunt Terra, with a special exhibition of the work of Felicity Aylieff.
- 2013. Terra in China – China in Terra.
- 2022. The 36 Vase parade - exhibition Echo of Majiayao - starting Terra Beijing

=== Photo Gallery ===
Some examples of the type of works of the artists, that had presented their works at the Gallery Terra Delft.

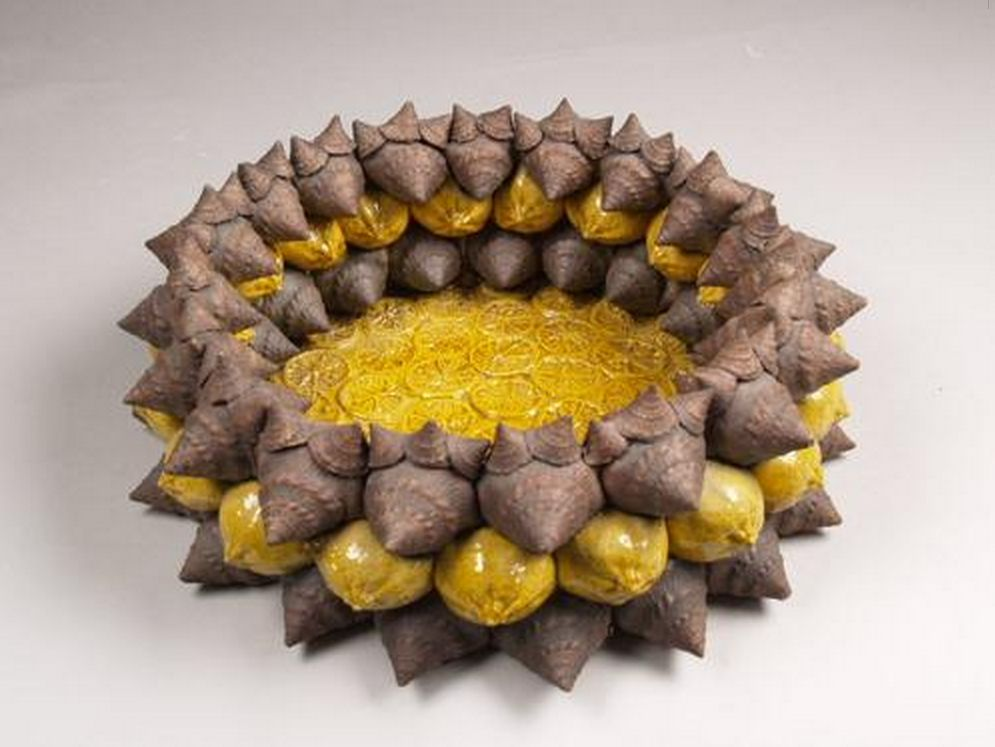
Scale with matt brown side (1995) by Wietske van Leeuwen, who had participated in 1996

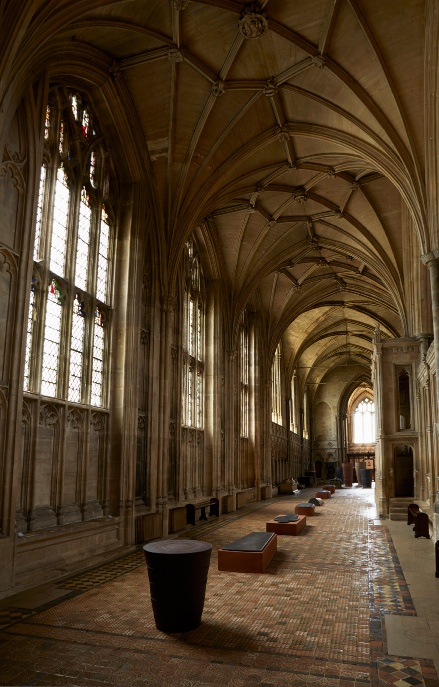
Quietus at Winchester Cathedral (2013) by Julian Stair, who had exhibited his work in 2005

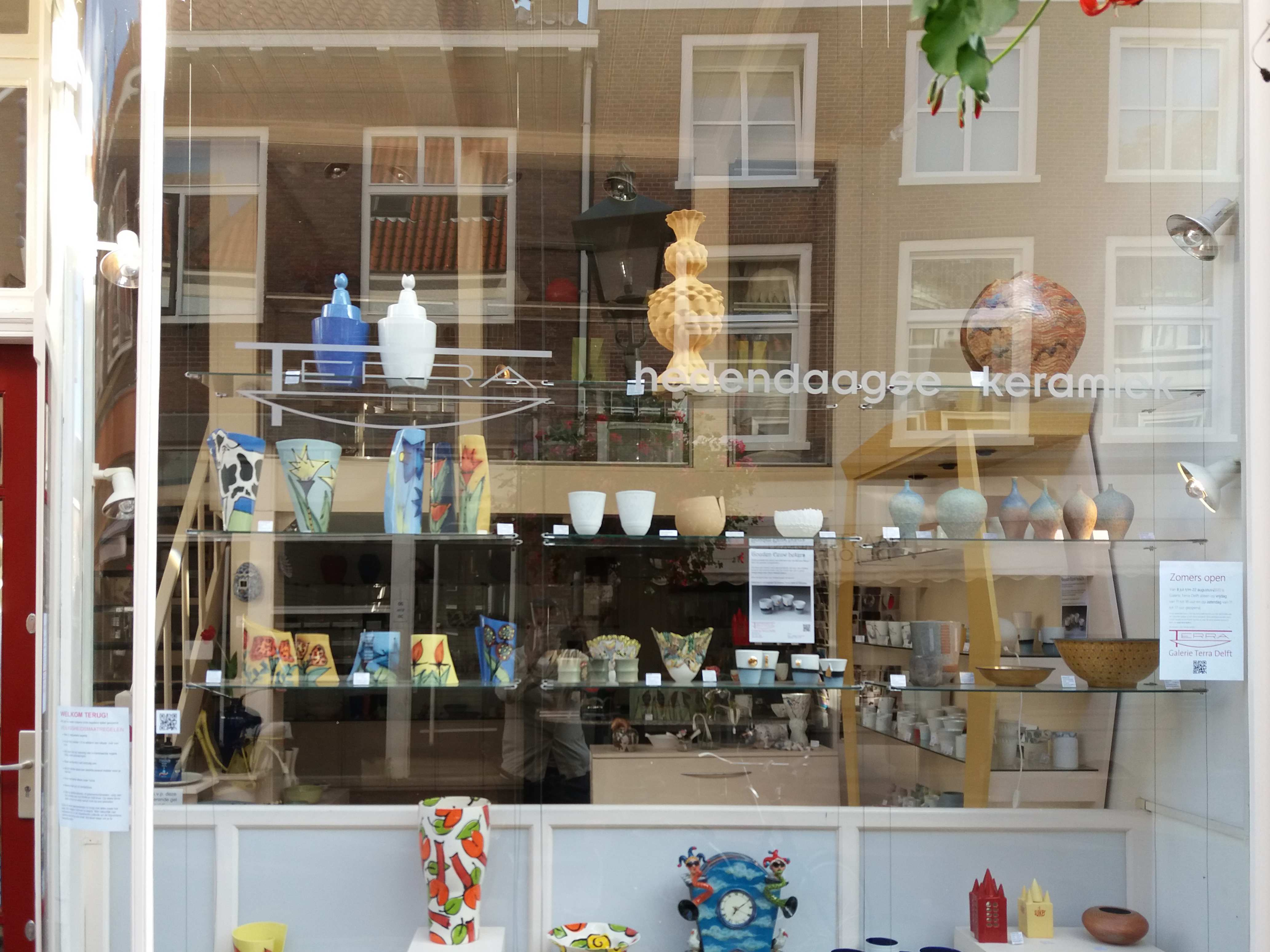
Galerie Terra in Delft, 2020

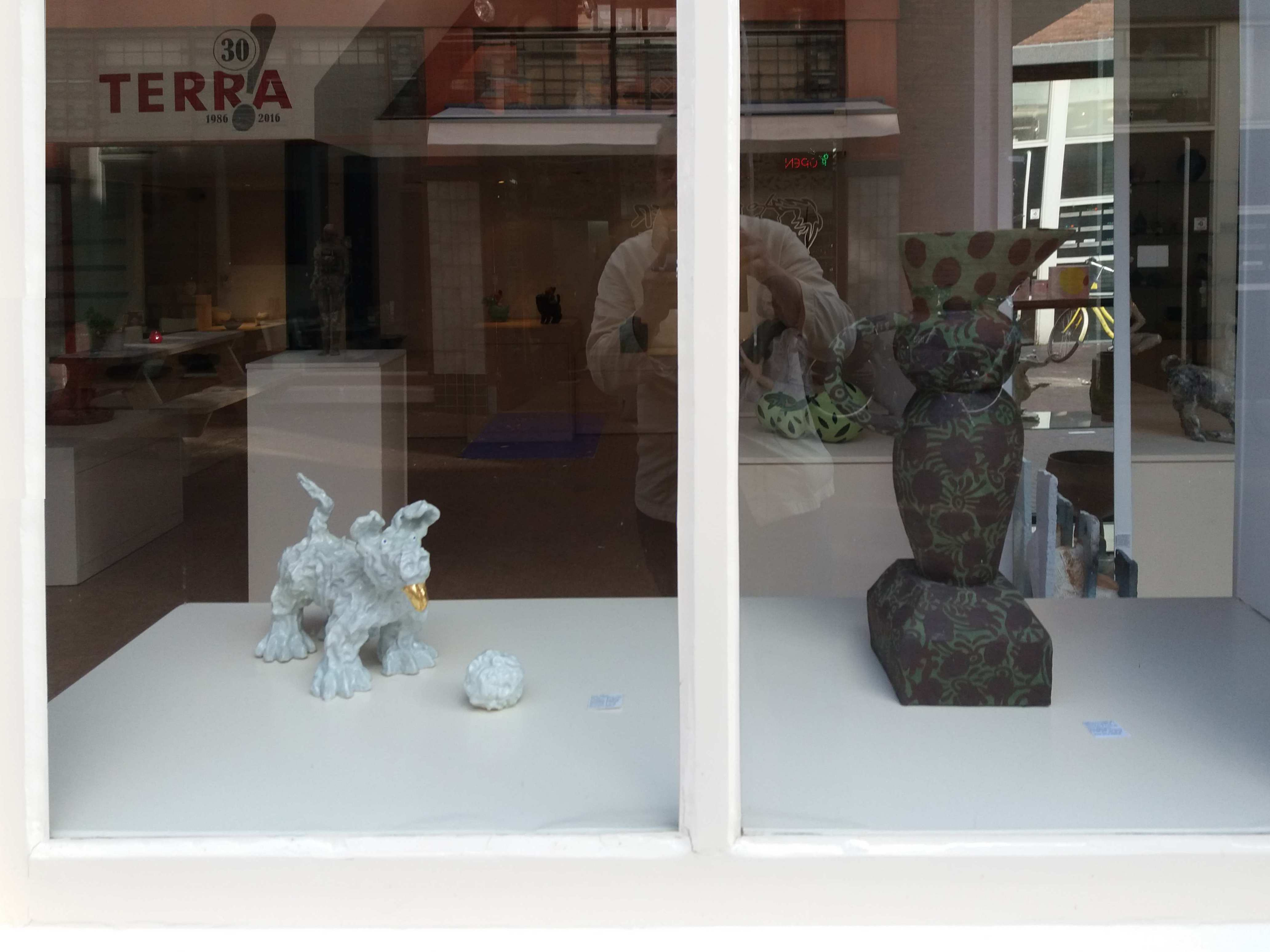
Galerie Terra in Delft, 2020

== Publications ==
- Simone Haak, Leven van keramiek = living by ceramics : 24 keramisten = 24 ceramists, Delft : Terra, 1987.
- Marjan Unger, Keramiek en Delft 1996 = Ceramics and Delft 1996. Delft : Terra Keramiek, 1996.
- Brandpunt Terra 2011, Tradition and Innovation in Ceramics, Stichting Keramiek Promotie Delft 2011, including DVD Out of Delft director Sara Verweij
- Ankie Maessen et al. (eds.). Ceramics - The Story of Thirty Years Terra Delft Gallery, Terra 30 jaar, 1986-2016.
- Etta Walda, Dirk Romijn : 1946-2017 : keramist, Delft : Galerie Terra Delft, 2018.
- Echo of Majiayao, the stay fourteen international ceramicists, 2021

== See also ==
- List of Dutch ceramists
