= Simone Haak =

Dutch visual artist

- Born: 6 June 1952; Ooststellingwerf
- Education: Academie Minerva; De Koninklijke Porceleyne Fles
- Known for: Ceramics

Simone Haak (born Ooststellingwerf, 6 June 1952) is a Dutch visual artist, who has worked as monumental artist. sculptor and ceramicist, She is art dealer at Gallery Terra Delft, which she co-founded with Joke Doedens (1962).

== Biography ==
=== Early years, education and the Porceleyne Fles ===
Haak was born and raised in Ooststellingwerf, a municipality in the province of Friesland. She studied art at the Academie Minerva in Minerva under Kees van Rensen. On his advised she continue her studies in Delft, where from 1975 to 1977 she was an apprentice at the experimental department of the De Koninklijke Porceleyne Fles under Theo Dobbelman.

The experimental department of De Koninklijke Porceleyne Fles in Delft had been a breathing ground for a new generation of Dutch ceramists since the 1950s. In the 1970s little had left but the remains of experiments of ceramists such as Emmy van Deventer. To create more spirit in consultation with Theo Dobbelman she started inviting other young artists, such as Evelyn van Baarda and Pauline Wiertz (1955–2019). The cooperation which started here, would continued later at the gallery.

After she left the Porceleyne Fles in 1997 Haak took a teaching position at the Het Rijnlands Lyceum Oegstgeest.

=== Later years at Gallery Terra Delft ===
In 1986 Haak founded the Gallery Terra in Delft together with Joke Doedens (1961). Their intention as to create new market opportunities for Dutch ceramists on the Dutch market.

The art gallery had started in 1986 in an patrician house at the Oude Delft, the eldest canal in Delft. After three years in 1989 it moved to a shop-premises in Nieuwstraat, a side street between the Oude Delft and the Wijnhaven, where it would remain.

== See also ==
- List of Dutch ceramists
