= Julian Stair =

British potter

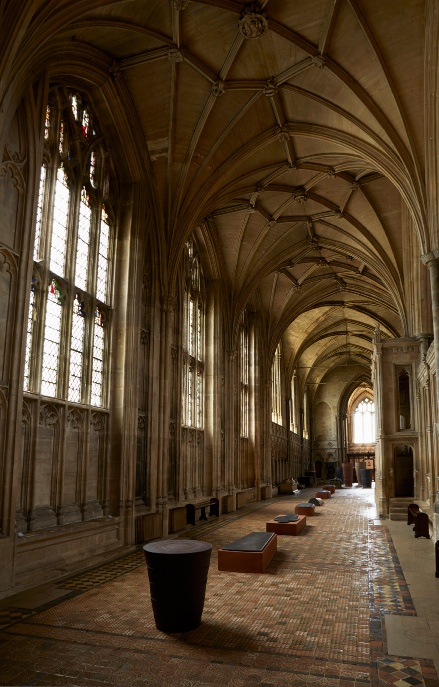
Quietus at Winchester Cathedral, 2013

Julian Francis Stair OBE (born 1955 in Bristol) is an English potter, academic and writer. He makes groups of work using a variety of materials, from fine glazed porcelain to coarse engineering brick clays. His work ranges in scale from hand-sized cups and teapots to monumental jars at over 6 feet tall and weighing half a ton.

Stair has exhibited internationally over the last 40 years and has work in over thirty public collections including the Victoria & Albert Museum, British Museum, American Museum of Art & Design, Hong Kong Museum of Art, Boijmans Museum, Mashiko Museum of Ceramic Art, Kolumba Museum and Fitzwilliam Museum. In 2004 he was awarded the European Achievement Award by the World Crafts Council for the project Extended Inhumation, and received a Queen Elizabeth Scholarship to research the making of monumental ceramics at Wienerberger's brick factory in Sedgley. In 2008 the Art Fund purchased Monumental Jar V for Middlesbrough Institute of Modern Art (mima) and in 2014 purchased "Reliquary for a Common Man" for the Crafts Council. In 2017 Stair was the recipient of the Bavarian State Prize in recognition of outstanding contribution to contemporary art and design.

Recent projects include the solo exhibitions: 'Art, Death and the Afterlife', Sainsbury Centre, Norwich, 'Equivalence', (Corvi-Mora Gallery, London, 'Quotidian', the re-imagining of the historic 'Grand Service at Corvi-Mora Gallery, London and Quietus: The Vessel, Death and the Human Body which was commissioned by mima and supported by Arts Council England. This exhibition addressed the containment of the human body in death and featured a series of funerary works, from cinerary jars to life-size sarcophagi.

== Education and work ==
Stair studied ceramics at Camberwell School of Art from 1974 to 1978, and at the Royal College of Art from 1978 to 1981. He completed a PhD in Critical Writing on English Studio Pottery: 1910–1940 at the Royal College of Art in 2002. He was a trustee of the Crafts Council and is a fellow of the Royal Society of Arts.

He lives and works in South London.

Stair was appointed Officer of the Order of the British Empire (OBE) in the 2022 New Year Honours for services to ceramics.

== Academic career ==
Stair was a Principal Research Fellow at the University of Westminster 2012-14. He was Senior Lecturer at the University of Roehampton, London, (1987–1998); Fellow in Craft & Criticism at Northumbria University, (1998–1999); Research Fellow at the Royal College of Art, (2004); and Senior Research Fellow at University of the Arts London, (2002–2011). He is an alumnus of Cape Farewell, UK, an interdisciplinary programme that explores a sustained artistic response to climate change. He joined the 2008 Disko Bay Expedition, visiting West Greenland with over 40 international artists, journalists and scientists.

He has been a regular contributor to ceramic journals since the mid-1980s. Recent publications include 'The Employment of Matter: Pottery of the Omega Workshop', contributing essay to Beyond Bloomsbury: Designs of the Omega Workshop 1913–19, Courtauld Gallery, London, 'Factive Plasticity: The Abstract Pottery of William Staite Murray', catalogue essay for Ben Nicholson, Winifred Nicholson, Christopher Wood, Alfred Wallis & William Staite Murray: Art and Life 1920-1931, Leeds Art Gallery, Kettle's Yard, Cambridge & Dulwich Picture Gallery, London, 'The Origins of Studio Pottery: From Precepts to Praxis', catalogue essay for Things of Beauty Growing, Yale Centre for British Art, USA, Fitzwilliam Museum, Cambridge, and 'The spark that ignited the flame: 1923, Hamada, Paterson's Gallery and English studio pottery', Ceramics, Art and Cultural Production in Modern Japan.

== Selected exhibitions and installations ==
Stair works to commission. Recent commissions include a group of works for the state apartments at Chatsworth House, Derbyshire, a 130-piece installation for a private London client, and an external installation of work in the gardens of the American Ambassador's residence at Winfield House, London.

- 2017 - "Things of Beauty Growing", Yale Center for British Art, Newhaven, USA
- 2017 - "Material : Earth", Messum's Wiltshire, UK, Exempla Art Far, Munich, Germany, TEFAF Maastricht, Netherlands,
- 2016 - "Re-naturing the Vessel: the shared approach of Julian Stair and Simone ten Hompel", Rosemarie Jäger Gallery, Hochheim, Frankfurt, Germany & Oxford Ceramics Gallery, UK
- 2016 - 'Big Ceramics', Wolverhampton Art Gallery, 'Cause and Effect', National Centre for Craft and Design, Seaford, 'Frieze', Corvi-Mora Gallery, London
- 2016 - Quietus Revisited, Manchester Cathedral, UK
- 2015 - "Vessels: The Spirit of Modern British Ceramics," Mashiko Museum of Ceramic Art, Japan, 'Frieze', Corvi-Mora Gallery, London, Contemporary Applied Arts, London
- 2014 - Quietus, Somerset House, London, UK
- 2014 - Quotidian, Corvi-Mora Gallery, London, UK
- 2014 - Vivarium, Corvi-Mora Gallery, London, 'Frieze', Corvi-Mora Gallery, London, 'Legacy, Two Works About Hope and Memory', Forty Hall, London & Collect, Saatchi Gallery, London
- 2014 - Quietus, Somerset House, London, UK
- 2013 - Quietus, National Museum of Wales, Cardiff, Winchester Cathedral, Winchester, UK
- 2013 - "The Matter of Life and Death," York Museum, UK
- 2012 – Quietus, Middlesbrough Institute of Modern Art, UK (touring to National Museum of Wales, Cardiff and Winchester Cathedral)
- 2012 – Curious, West Norwood Cemetery, UK
- 2010 – The Scottish Gallery, Edinburgh
- 2006 – Galerie Marianne Heller, Heidelberg, Germany
- 2005 – Terra Keramik, Delft, Netherlands
- 2004 – Collect, Victoria & Albert Museum, London (juried individual exhibitor)
- 2002 – Egg, London
- 2001 – Contemporary Applied Arts, London
- 2000 – Anton Gallery, Washington DC, USA
- 1999 – Lynn Strover Gallery, Cambridge
- 1998 – Ingleby Gallery, Edinburgh
- 1997 – Showcase Exhibition, Contemporary Applied Arts, London
- 1988 – Anton Gallery, Washington DC, USA
- 1987 – Anatol Orient, London
- 1987 – Crafts Council Showcase, Institute of Contemporary Art, London
- 1986 – Westminster Gallery, Boston, USA
- 1985 – Anatol Orient, London
- 1984 – Oxford Gallery, Oxford
- 1983 – Katharine House Gallery, Marlborough, UK

== Awards and grants ==
- 2011 – Grant for Quietus, Arts Council England
- 2011 – Finalist, International Triennial of Silicate Arts, Kecskemét, Hungary
- 2008 – Art Fund purchase of Monumental Jar V, Middlesbrough Institute of Modern Art from COLLECT at the Victoria & Albert Museum
- 2005 – Finalist, Hamlyn Award
- 2004 – European Achievement Award, World Crafts Council
- 2004 – Queen Elizabeth Scholarship
- 2003 – Finalist, World Ceramic Exposition, Seoul, Korea

== Selected public collections ==
- Crafts Council, London, UK
- Hong Kong Museum of Art, Hong Kong, Hong Kong
- Museum of Arts & Design Manhattan, New York City, USA
- British Council, UK
- Museum Boijmans Van Beuningen, Rotterdam, Netherlands
- Middlesbrough Institute of Modern Art, Middlesbrough, UK
- National Museum of Wales, Wales, UK
- York City Art Gallery, York, UK
- Victoria and Albert Museum, London, UK
- British Museum, London, UK
- Mashiko Museum of Ceramic Art, Japan
- Kolumba Museum, Cologne, Germany
