= Marjan Unger =

Dutch art historian, author and jewellery collector

- Born: Marianne de Boer; 11 February 1946; Bussum, Netherlands
- Died: 27 June 2018 (aged 72); Bussum, Netherlands
- Occupation(s): Art Historian; Lecturer; Author
- Spouse: Gerard Unger
- Children: Flora Unger-Weisfelt (?–2012)

Marianne de Boer, later known as Marjan Unger (11 February 1946 – 27 June 2018), was a Dutch art historian. She acquired a public reputation as the author of a standard work on Dutch jewelry and as a jewelry collector.

== Life and work ==
=== Early life and education ===
Marianne de Boer was born into an entrepreneurial family exactly nine months after the liberation. She was born and grew up at Bussum, a small town located between Amsterdam and Utrecht, and close to the (subsequently reclaimed) southern part of the Zuiderzee. Marianne was one of three children in the family: her father was a contractor for the hydraulic engineering sector. At school she excelled in Mathematics. She studied Industrial Design at the Arts and Crafts Academy ("Kunstrijverheidschool", but subsequently renamed) in Amsterdam between 1964 and 1967, but never completed her course. It was here that she met the artist-designer Gerard Unger whom she married in 1968. At the academy she suffered terribly from headaches which were diagnosed provisionally as "migraine-related". The academy was housed in a brand new building with modern plastic ceilings, carpet block flooring and a permanent smell of "paint" in the air. Ten years later it would be determined that the headaches were part of an allergic reaction to the chemical gases given off by the exotic materials used in the interior construction of the modern academy building.

Marjan Unger's drive to find out everything about art remained undimmed, and after the birth of Flora, the couple's daughter, she again became a student, studying art history at the University of Amsterdam between 1974 and 1987. She combined this with a teaching job at the Amsterdam Fashion Academy of which she became a director in 1973 and where, according to her husband she brought about a change of culture by attracting guest-lecturers from industry. Unger left the Amsterdam academy in 1977, but teaching was a recurring theme throughout her career. She later taught both at the Rotterdam Art Academy and, between 1982 and 2006, at the Rietveld Academie.

=== Early career ===
A compulsive communicator, between 1980 and 1989 Unger was editor in chief of "Bijvoorbeeld", a magazine focusing on creative and applied arts which according to one admirer she "transformed from a rather dusty magazine into a lively and critical [post-modern avant-gardist] periodical". In 1995 she began teaching a post graduate course at Amsterdam's "Sandberg Institute", on what she termed "Vrije vormgeving" (free design) which placed her at the interface between art, design and commerce.

Shortly before she died Marjan Unger was asked about her decision to research twentieth century Dutch jewellery:

"Around 1995 when I was looking for a research topic, the history of jewellery in the Netherlands was one that was as badly researched and documented as any. Also, there was no museum in the Netherlands that had collected jewellery by Dutch designers from the period 1900-1965. Because there was nothing from that period, I started to gather my own collection in 1995. I also purchased many pieces from my own students post-graduation"
"Toen ik rond 1995 op zoek was naar een onderwerp om me helemaal in te kunnen verdiepen, bleek de geschiedenis van het sieraad in Nederland het slechtst onderzocht en beschreven. Er was ook geen museum in Nederland dat tussen 1900 en 1965 sieraden van Nederlandse ontwerpers had verzameld. Omdat er niets was uit die periode, ben ik vanaf 1995 zelf maar gaan verzamelen. Ook heb ik veel stukken gekocht van mijn eindexamenstudenten."

Marjan Unger, interviewed by Henny de Lange in 2018

It was around 1995 that Unger's passion for jewellery came to the fore. She began more than a decade of intensive research. She also began to build up a jewellery collection of her own, many of her purchases consciously supporting younger innovative designers working outside the mainstream jewellery industry. She wore her more unconventional pieces, giving rise to "how do you dare wear that?" reactions. In 2002 Unger organised the "Zonder wrijving geen glans" (loosely, "no shine without friction") jewellery exhibition at the Utrecht Art Museum ("Centraal Museum"), which showcased the Dutch jewellery industry during the first two thirds of the twentieth century.

Her first book was published in 2004 - "Het Nederlandse sieraad in de 20ste eeuw" dealt with the Dutch jewellery business during the twentieth century, thereby filling a perceived gap in the academic literature. It has been described as a "bulky standard work" ("...het lijvige standaardwerk van haar hand"). She produced a new arts magazine "Morf", aimed at arts students, and selling circa 20,000 copies twice yearly between 2004 and 2008. It was a mixture of old and new texts giving wider context for Unger's lectures, and those of colleagues.

=== Later career ===
Continuing with her researches led to the award of her doctorate from Leiden University on 17 March 2010. Her dissertation was entitled "Sieraad in context, een multidisciplinair kader voor de beschouwing van het sieraad" (loosely, "Jewelry in context: a multi-disciplinary framework for evaluating jewels").

At the same time as she was completing her doctoral dissertation Marjan Unger and her husband made a substantial donation of 492 pieces of jewelry from her collection to the Dutch National Museum ("Rijksmuseum") in Amsterdam. The pieces donated included items she had commissioned from known designers but also many pieces produced by unknown artists from outside the jewelry mainstream. Alongside the jewelry collection, items donated also included a large collection of ABBA button-badges and some coin-based jewelry.

Personal tragedy struck in 2012 when the Ungers' only child was killed by cancer. Gerard Unger had by now established himself internationally as a typeface designer as a result of which Flora Unger-Weisfelt is celebrated by an unusual memorial. An "upright sans italic" font was named after her in 1984.

Marjan Unger's second book, "Jewellery Matters", was written jointly with the Rijksmuseum curator Suzanne van Leeuwen and was published in 2017. In 2017 Unger handed over another 200 pieces, described by sources as "the rest of her collection", to the Rijksmuseum. She told an interviewer that this had always been her intention, but the discovery of her incurable metastatic bone cancer had hastened the action.

== Publications, a selection ==
- Unger, Marjan, Keramiek en Delft 1996 = Ceramics and Delft 1996. Delft : Terra Keramiek, 1996.
- Unger, Marjan, Het Nederlandse sieraad in de 20ste eeuw. Bussum: THOTH, 2004.
- Unger-de Boer, Marianne, Sieraad in context, een multidisciplinair kader voor de beschouwing van het sieraad, Phd thesis, 2010.
- Unger, Marjan with Suzanne van Leeuwen, Jewellery Matters. Rotterdam/Amsterdam, 2017.
