= Clara van Sparwoude =

Dutch noblewoman (1530–1615)

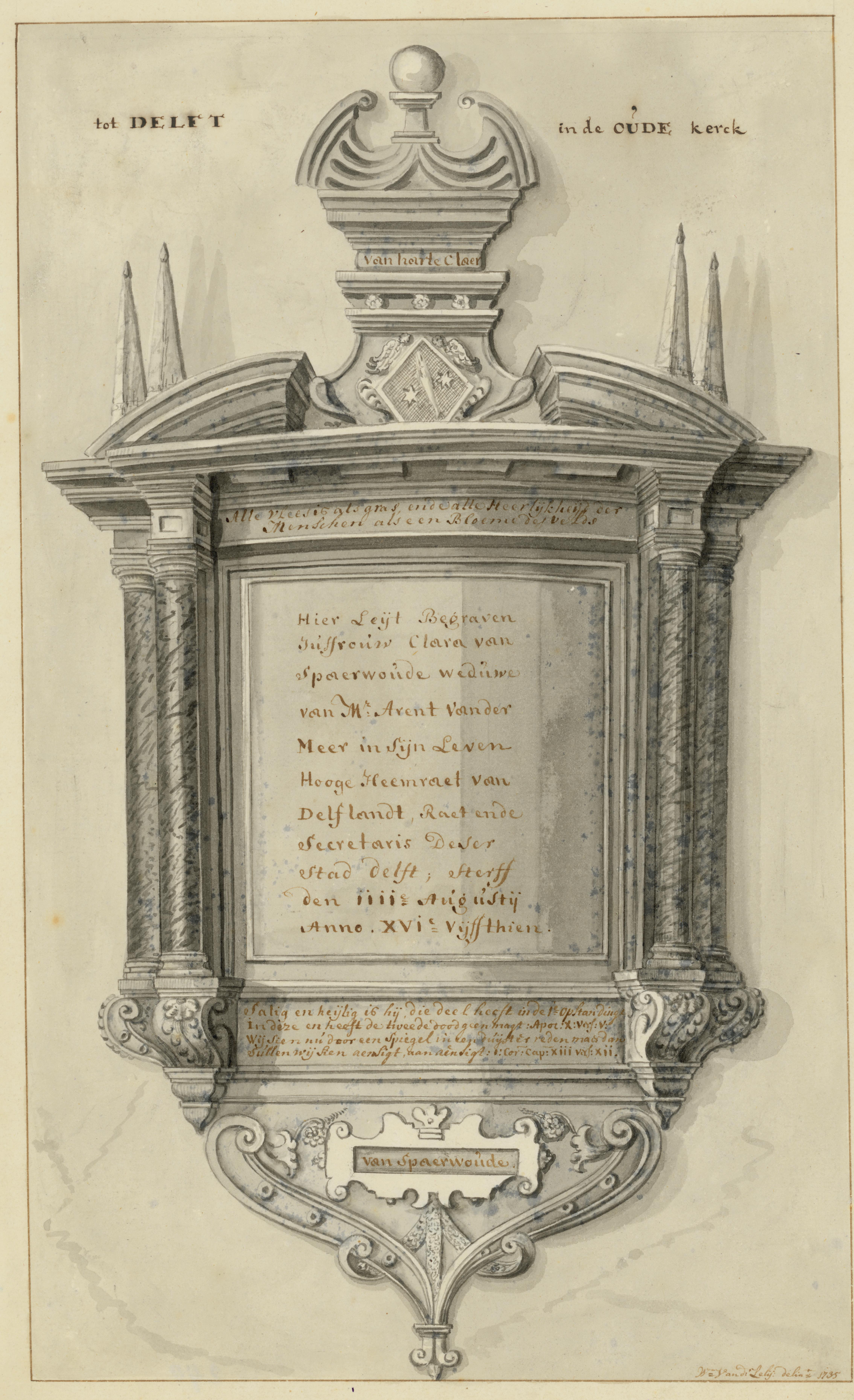
Drawing of the epitaph of Clara van Sparwoude in the Oude Kerk in Delft, by Willem van der Lelij, 1735. Coll. Stadsarchief Delft, inv.nr. 68862.

Clara Jansdochter van Sparwoude (sometimes written Spaerwoude) (ca. 1530 – 4 August 1615) was a Dutch noblewoman of Delft who is chiefly remembered for her great wealth and various charitable funds from her estate. The most famous of these granted a sum of money to each of her relatives and their descendants upon their marriage, and was in continuous operation until 1922, when the monies were liquidated by the Dutch government.

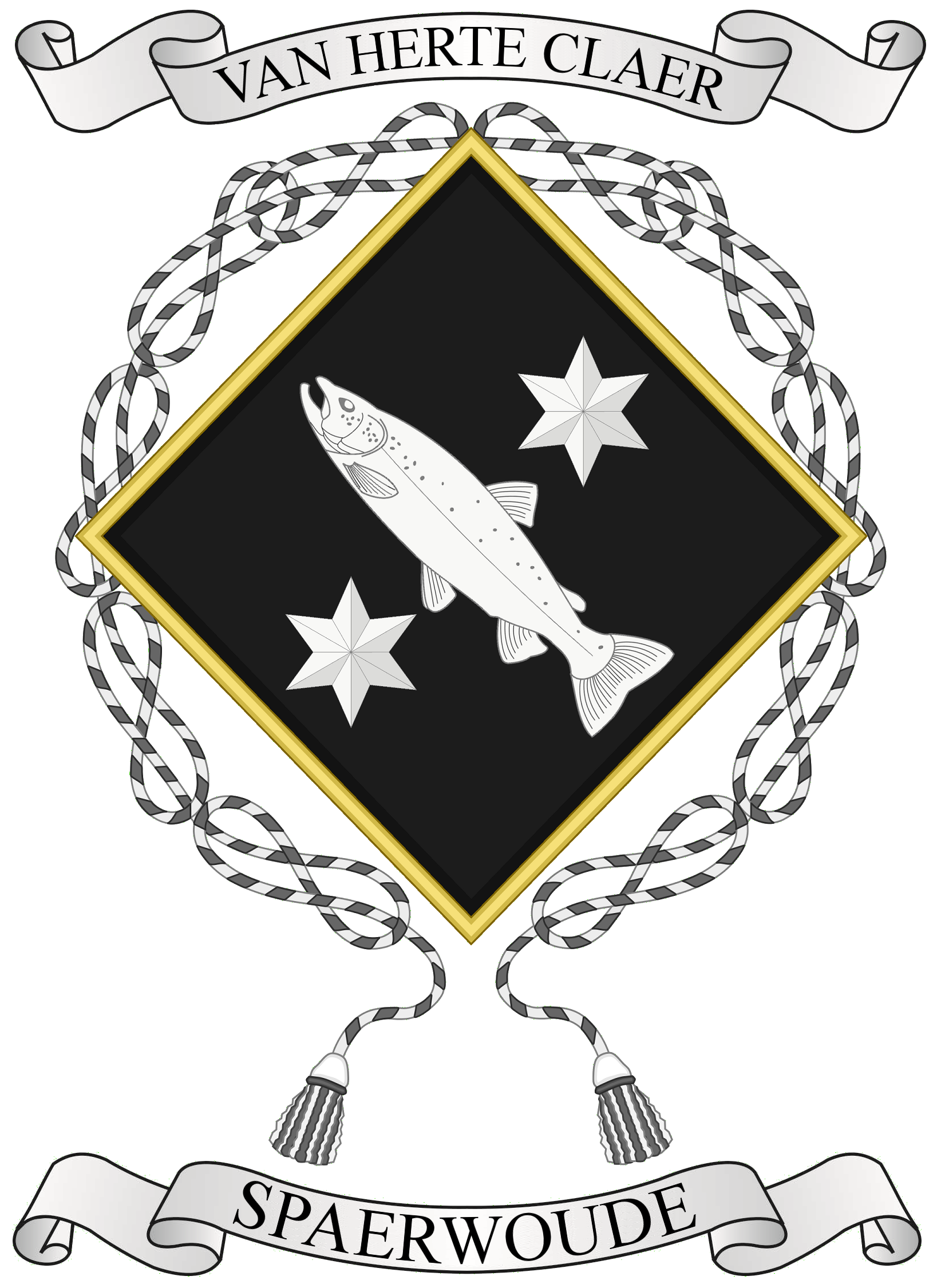
Coat of arms of Clara van Sparwoude as they appear in a portrait from 1565

== Life and legacy ==
Clara was the daughter of Jan Heyndrixzn. (1477–1552) a goldsmith of Delft, and his second wife Willemtgen Willemsdr (1495–1564). In 1556 she married Arent Vranckenzn. van der Meer (died 1596), a high-ranking city official and burgemeester in Delft. Following her death on 4 August 1615, she was interred on 8 August in the Oude Kerk in Delft, where her prominent tomb is visible still.

== Clara van Sparwoude Fund ==
As Clara and her husband had no children together, upon her death she donated her considerable riches to various charitable projects, including a fund for "poor relations", typically interpreted as meaning all descendants of her elder half-brother Adriaan and younger half-sister Maritgen. A payment was made to each relation upon their wedding.

Originally a considerable sum of money, the amount paid dwindled over the centuries as a result of inflation and the increasing number of relations. In the early 20th century the Dutch government retained an official whose responsibilities included maintaining the pedigree of Clara van Sparwoude's family and disbursing the funds to qualifying relatives.

By the 1920s the fund still held half a million guilders, but the payment per relation had dwindled to the equivalent of €11.35. In 1922 the Dutch government passed a law liquidating the balance of the fund and dispensing it among the poorest 10% of adult van Sparwoude relations.

== Clara van Sparwoudestraat ==
Originally, a Clara van Sparwoudestraat had already been established on 26 October 1938 in the Delft expansion plan of 1931, but that plan was canceled. In 1970 a street in Delft was named after her by decision of the council.
