= Gerard Unger =

Dutch typographer (1942–2018)

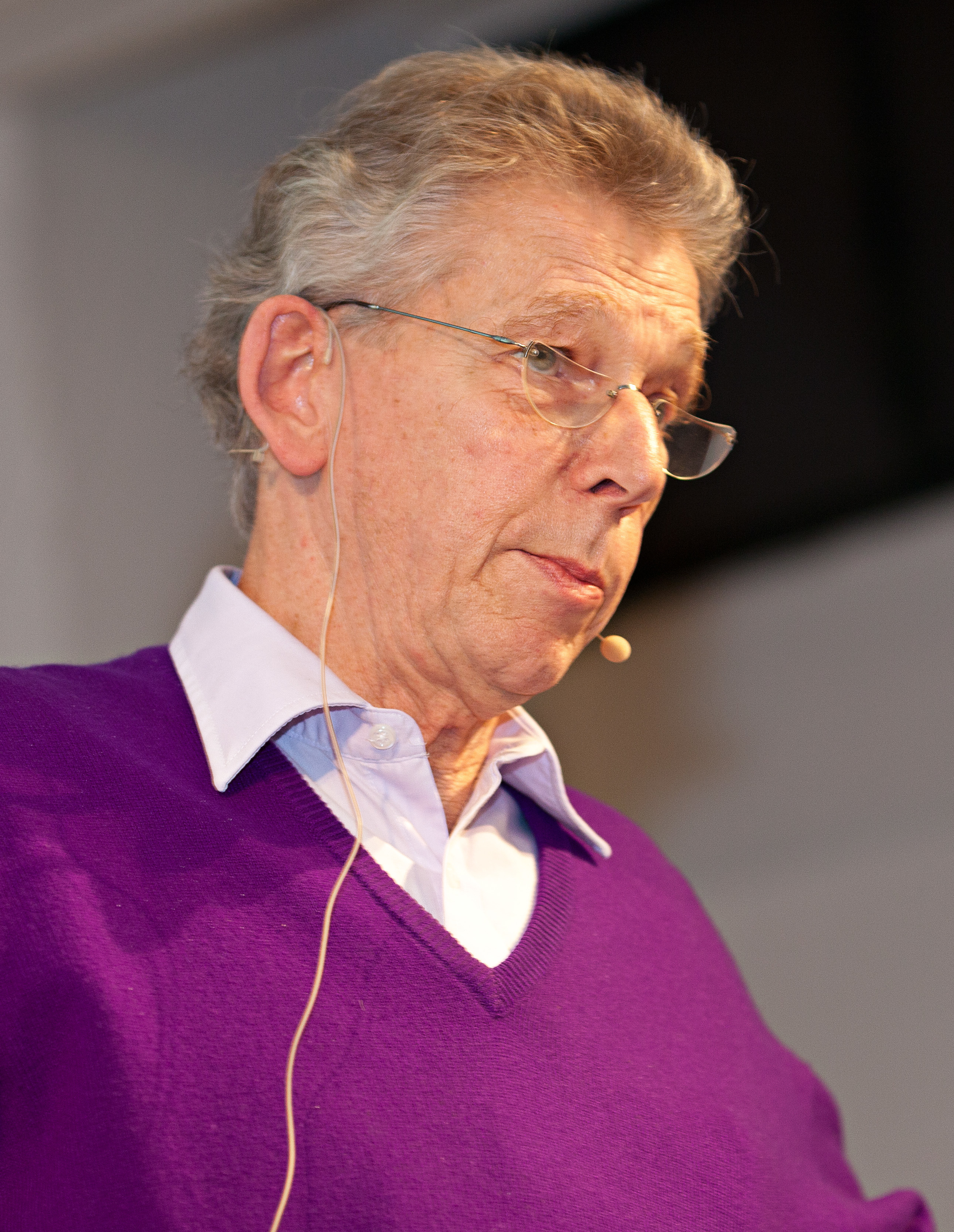
- Unger in 2010
- Born: 22 January 1942; Arnhem, Netherlands
- Died: 23 November 2018 (aged 76); Bussum, Netherlands
- Education: Gerrit Rietveld Academie
- Known for: Typographer, Graphic designer
- Spouse: Marjan Unger (1946–2018)
- Awards: H.N. Werkmanprijs; 1984; Maurits Enschedé prize 1991; SOTA Typography Award; 2009; Piet Zwart Lifetime Achievement Award; 2012

Gerard Unger (22 January 1942 – 23 November 2018) was a Dutch graphic and type designer. He studied at the Gerrit Rietveld Academie in Amsterdam from 1963 to 1967, and subsequently worked at Total Design, Prad and Joh. Enschedé. In 1975, he established himself as an independent developer. A long-time guest lecturer at the University of Reading, he mentored many modern typeface designers. He lived and worked in Bussum, Netherlands.

== Work ==
Unger developed many typefaces over the years, of which several were specially developed for newspapers (usually typefaces with a large x-height and large inner counters), such as Swift, Gulliver, Coranto and Vesta. He also developed designs for magazines, coins, books, logos and stamps.

A large number of Unger's typefaces are available from Linotype and the Dutch Type Library; his more recent faces are also available through the foundry Type Together. He released new work on his own website from 1995. Unger designed typefaces for the signage systems of both the Dutch highways (ANWB-fonts) and the Amsterdam metro. His newspaper face Gulliver (1993) is familiar to millions of readers, as it is the typeface used by several European newspapers, including the Stuttgarter Zeitung. It was formerly used by USA Today over the course of a decade. His typeface Coranto is the typeface for The Scotsman and the Brazilian newspaper Valor.

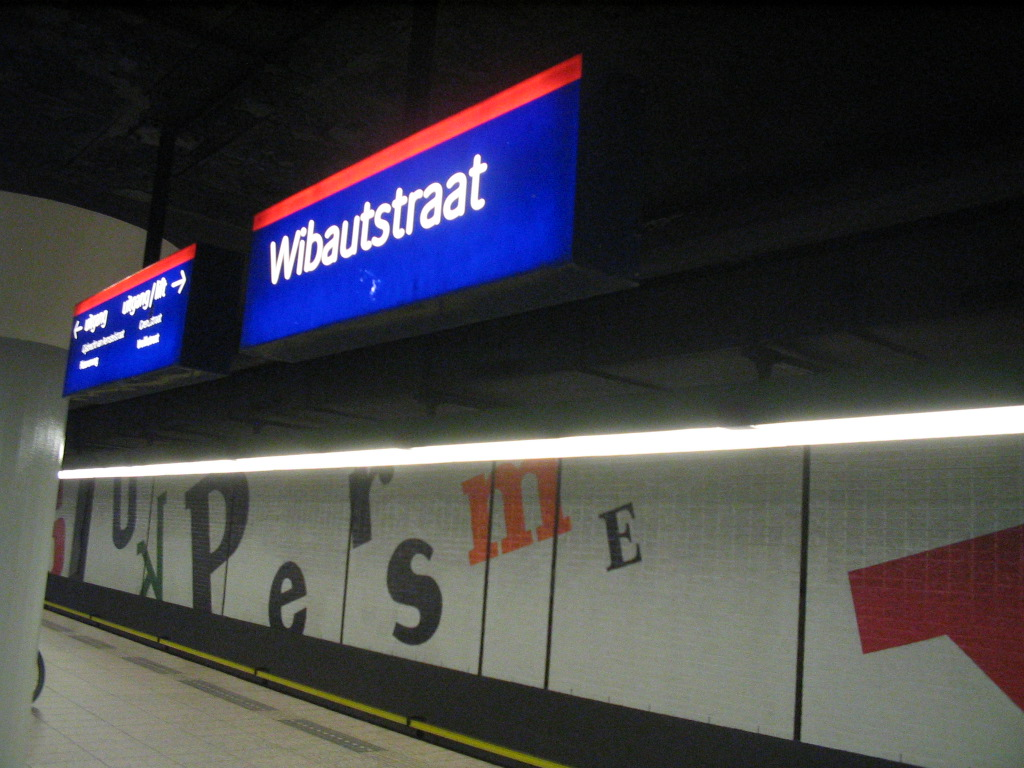
Wibautstraat metro station (Amsterdam, Netherlands), July 2005

In addition to his work in type design, he was active in the field of education. Unger taught at the Gerrit Rietveld Academie for over 30 years, and from 1994, he was a visiting professor at the University of Reading at the Department of Typography and Graphic Communication. From 2006 to 2012, he was a lecturer in typography at the Department of Fine Arts of the University of Leiden.

His most important publication was Terwijl je leest (1997) (in English While You're Reading). It later appeared in various languages, and in 2006 it was completely revised and reprinted. In 2004, he delivered the Tiele-lecture (of the Dr. P.A. Tiele Stichting) under the title Veranderend lezen, lezend veranderen (rough translation: Transformed Reading). In September 2013, he received a PhD degree on a new typeface called Alverata, which he developed while researching medieval lettering.

== Death ==
Gerard Unger died at his home in Bussum on 23 November 2018, approximately five months after his wife's death.

=== Gerard Unger Scholarship ===
Shortly after his death, the type foundry TypeTogether, publisher of many of Unger's typefaces, announced that their Typeface Publishing Incentive Program would be renamed the Gerard Unger Scholarship in his honor. The yearly scholarship gives a student or recent graduate the opportunity to receive feedback and mentorship, as well as a monetary grant, as they complete a typeface designed during their studies.

== Awards ==
Unger received various awards, including the H.N. Werkman prize (1984) the Maurits Enschedé prize (1991) and in 2009 the SOTA Typography Award. In 2008 he received an honorary doctorate from the university of Hasselt, Belgium and in 2009 from Estonian Academy of Arts. In 2012 he was awarded the "Piet Zwart Lifetime Achievement Award" by the Association of Dutch Designers BNO. In 2017 he was awarded the TDC Medal by the Type Directors Club.

=== Typefaces designed by Unger ===
- Demos (1976/2001 [Neue Demos]/2015 [Demos Next])
- Praxis (1977/2001 [Neue Praxis]/2017 [Praxis Next])
- Hollander (1983)
- Flora (1984)
- Swift (1985/1995 [Neue Swift])
- Amerigo (1986)
- Argo (1991)
- Gulliver (1993)
- ANWB-fonts (1997)
- Capitolium (1998/2011 [Capitolium 2])
- Paradox (1999)
- Coranto (2000/2011 [Coranto 2])
- Vesta (2001/2011)
- Big Vesta (2003/2011)
- Capitolium News (2006/2011)
- Capitolium Headline (2011)
- Coranto Headline (2011)
- Alverata (2013)
- Sanserata (2016)

== Literature ==
- Gerard Unger, Letters, Uitgeverij De Buitenkant, Amsterdam, (1994) (ISBN 978-90-70386-69-6)
- Gerard Unger, Veranderend lezen, lezend veranderen, Walburg Pers, Zutphen (2004) (ISBN 9057303256)
- Gerard Unger, While You're Reading, Mark Batty Publisher, New York, (2006) (ISBN 0976224518)
- Gerard Unger, Typography as Vehicle of Science, Uitgeverij de Buitenkant, Amsterdam (2007), (ISBN 978-90-76452-67-8), inaugural lecture at Leiden University
- Jos A.A.M. Biemans & Gerard Unger, Eeuwenlang letters : lettervormen in de Koninklijke Bibliotheek, Bekking & Blitz, Amersfoort (2012)
- Gerard Unger, Alverata : hedendaagse Europese letters met wortels in de middeleeuwen, Uitgeverij de Buitenkant, Amsterdam (2013), (ISBN 978-94-90913-40-3), academic dissertation at Leiden University
- Gerard Unger, Theory of Type Design, NAi010 Publishers, Rotterdam, (2018) (ISBN 978-94-6208-440-7)
