= Oude Kerk (Delft) =

Church in Delft, the Netherlands

Coordinates: 52°0′45″N 4°21′19″E

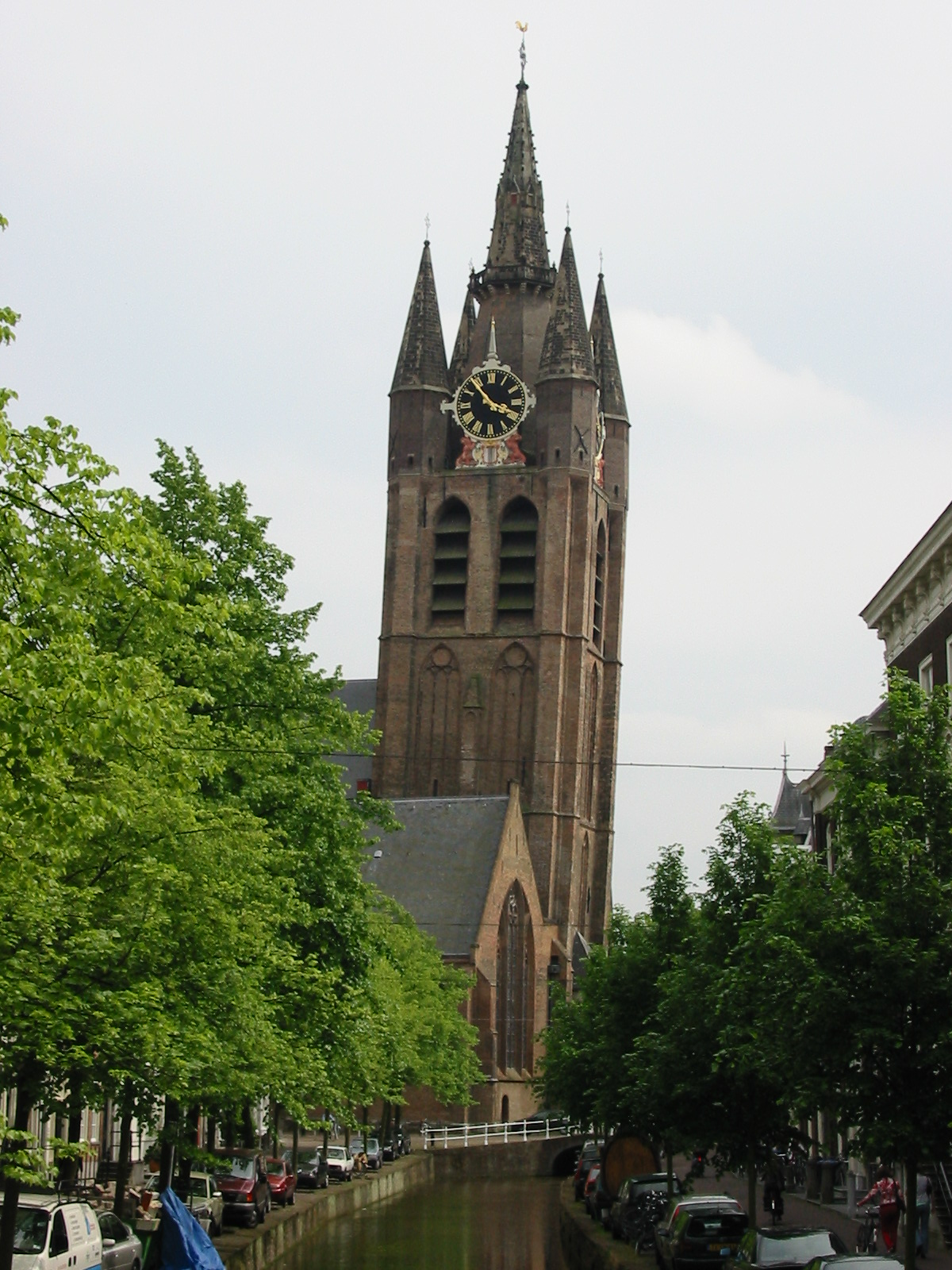
- Oude Kerk
- Location: Delft, Netherlands
- Denomination: Protestant Church in the Netherlands
- Previous denomination: Roman Catholic

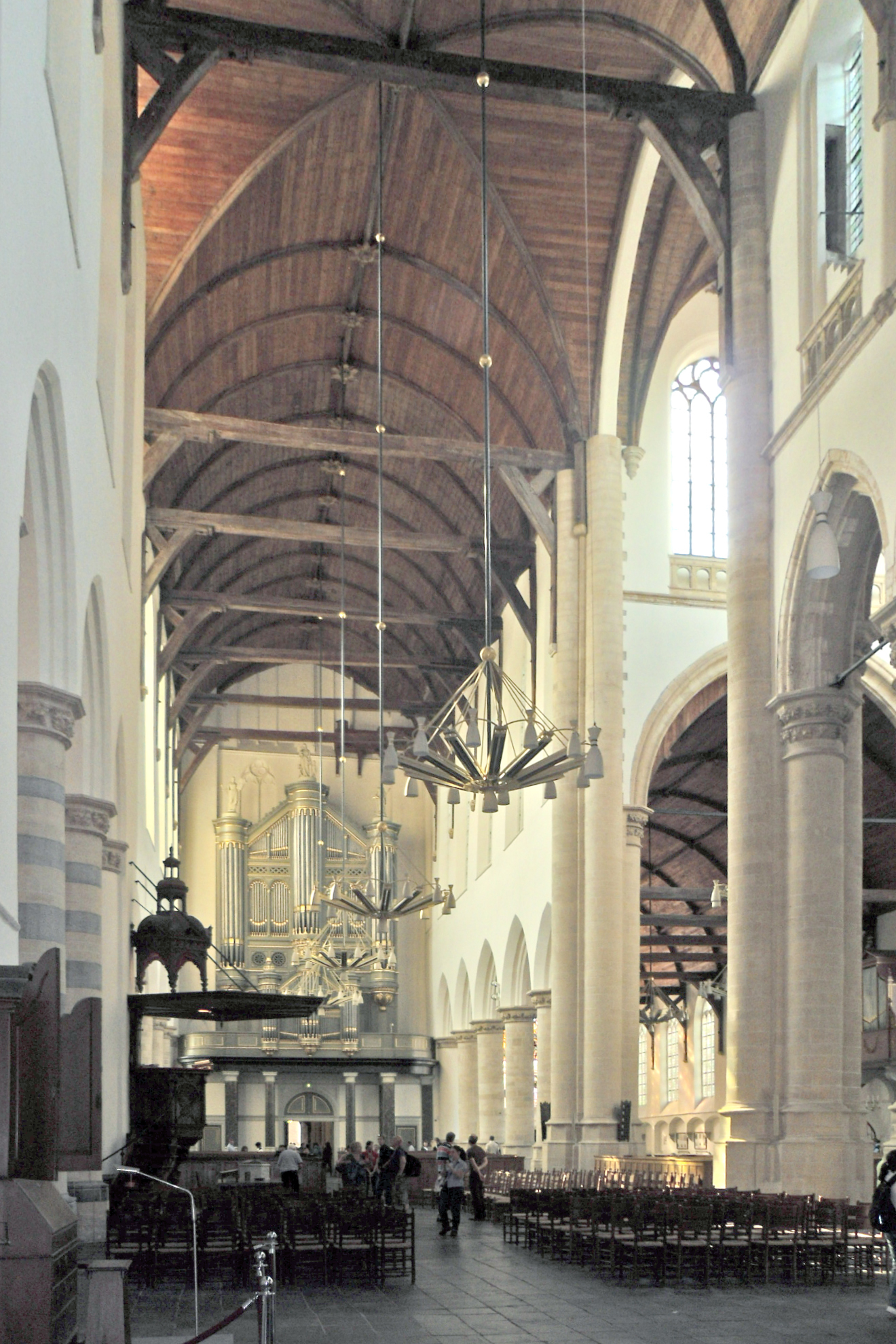
Interior of the church

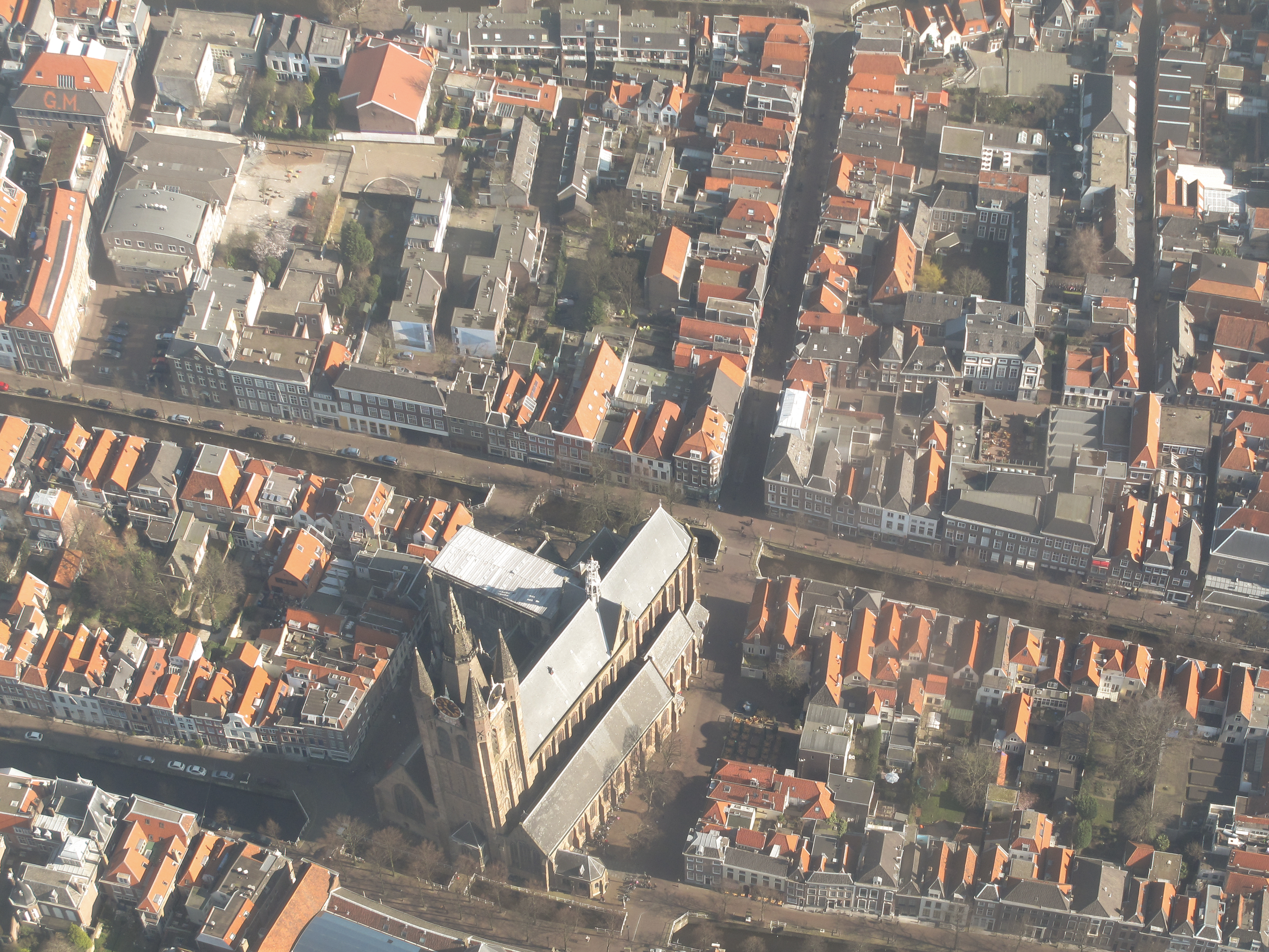
The church from above

The Oude Kerk (Old Church), nicknamed Oude Jan ("Old John") and Scheve Jan ("Skewed John"), is a Gothic Protestant church in the old city centre of Delft, the Netherlands. Its most recognisable feature is a 75-metre-high brick tower that leans about two metres from the vertical.

== History ==
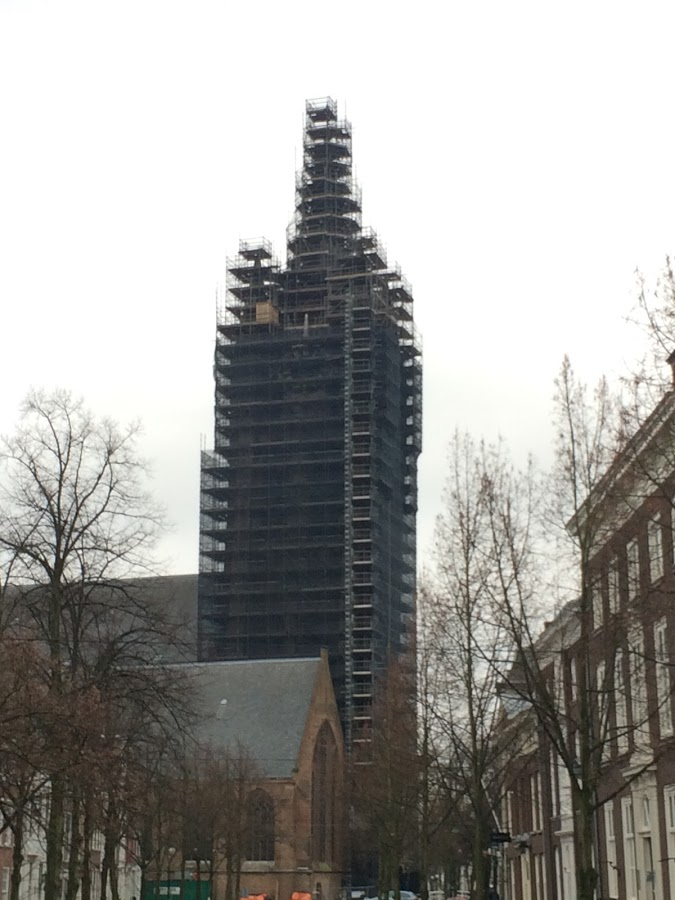
The Oude Kerk undergoing renovations in 2017.

The Oude Kerk was founded as St Bartholomew's Church in the year 1246, on the site of previous churches dating back up to two centuries earlier. The layout followed that of a traditional basilica, with a nave flanked by two smaller aisles.

The tower with its central spire and four corner turrets was added between 1325–50, and dominated the townscape for a century and a half until it was surpassed in height by the Nieuwe Kerk (New Church). During its construction the foundations were not strong enough to support the building, and the church began to lean. As work continued, the builders tried to compensate for its lean on each layer of the tower, but to this day only the four turrets at the top are truly vertical. It is possible that the course of the adjacent canal had to be shifted slightly to make room for the tower, leaving an unstable foundation that caused the tilt.

By the end of the 14th century, expansion of the side aisles to the height of the nave transformed the building into a hall church, which was rededicated to St Hippolytus. The church again took on a typical basilican cross-section with the construction of a higher nave between about 1425 and 1440.

The Delft town fire of 1536 and the turmoil of the Protestant Reformation brought a premature end to an ambitious expansion project led by two members of the Keldermans family of master builders. This construction phase resulted in the flat-roofed, stone-walled northern transept arm that differs markedly in style from the older parts.

The Delft Thunderclap in 1654 shattered the majority of the church's stained-glass windows; in the course of Delft's repair, many of the windows were given ordinary glass panes while other windows were bricked up.

The great fire, iconoclasm, weather, and the Delft Thunderclap took their toll on the church and its furnishings, necessitating much repair work over the years. During one renovation, the tower turrets were rebuilt in a more vertical alignment than the leaning body below, giving the tower as a whole a slightly kinked appearance. The current stained-glass windows were crafted by the master glazier Joep Nicolas in the mid-20th century.

== Furnishings ==
The church possesses three pipe organs, from the years 1857 (main organ), 1873 (north aisle), and 1770 (choir).

== Bells ==
There are two bells that hang in the tower: the large trinitasklok or bourdon, which chimes every hour, and the small Laudate, which chimes every half hour.

The larger of the two bells, cast in 1570, weighs nearly nine tonnes, and because of its strong and potentially damaging vibrations is rung only on such special occasions as the burial of a Dutch royal family member in the nearby New Church. The massive bell is also sounded during disasters when local air-raid sirens are sounded (but not during the monthly country-wide siren tests). In April 2020, the Bourdon was part of the "Bells of Hope" initiative as a token of appreciation for relief workers and caregivers during the first weeks of the outbreak of the COVID-19 pandemic.

In 1943, the smaller of the two bells, together with the one from the Nieuwe Kerk, was taken by the occupying Germans to be melted down. This never happened; in 1946, Laudate was put back in its old place.

== Graves ==
Approximately 400 people are entombed in the Oude Kerk, including the following notables:

- Elizabeth Morgan, daughter of nobleman Marnix van St. Aldegonde (1608)
- noblewoman and benefactrix Clara van Sparwoude (1615)
- naval hero Piet Hein (1629)
- writer Jan Stalpaert van der Wiele (1630)
- naval hero Maarten Tromp (1653)
- painter Johannes Vermeer (1675)
- painter Hendrick Cornelisz van Vliet, who had painted the church interior (1675)
- statesman Anthonie Heinsius (1720)
- scientist Antonie van Leeuwenhoek (1723)
- poet Hubert Poot (1733)

== See also ==
- List of tallest structures built before the 20th century
