= De Koninklijke Porceleyne Fles =

Dutch earthenware factory

Royal Delft
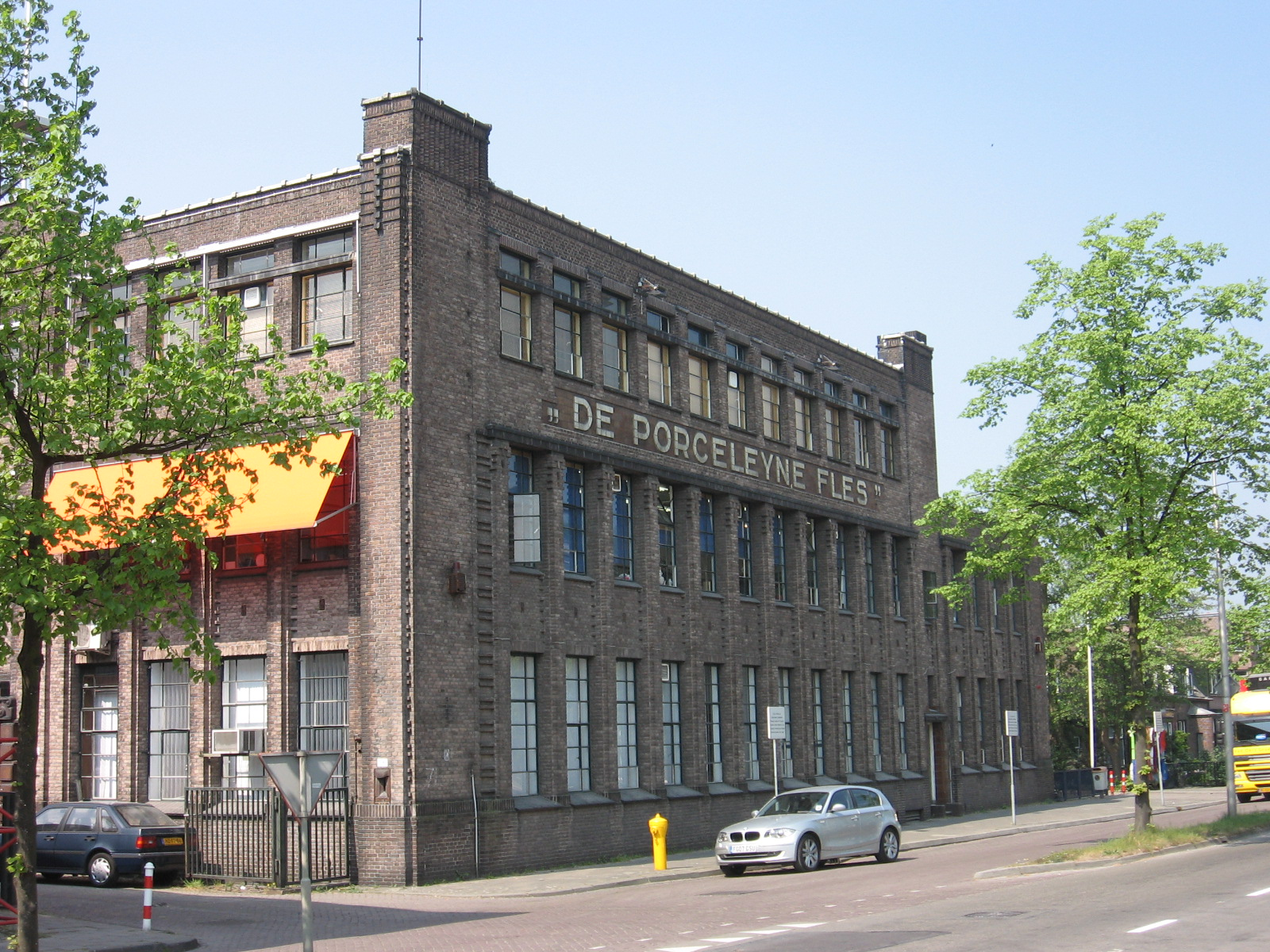
- Main factory of the Porceleyne Fles in Delft
- Trade name: Royal Delft
- Native name: Koninklijke Porceleyne Fles N.V.
- Type: Public company
- ISIN: NL0000378669
- Founded: 1653; 373 years ago
- Founder: David Anthonisz. v. d. Pieth
- Headquarters: Delft, Netherlands
- Key people: Henk Schouten CEO

The Koninklijke Porceleyne Fles N.V. (trading publicly as Royal Delft) is a Dutch manufacturer of Delftware, a type of earthenware, headquartered in Delft, the Netherlands. It is the only remaining factory out of 32 that were established in Delft during the 17th century. Today, the company has been active for over 360 years without interruption. Despite the name, its products are not in fact porcelain.

== History ==
During the Dutch Golden Age, the Dutch East India Company had a lively trade with the East and imported millions of pieces of Chinese export porcelain in the early 17th century. Exotic blue-and-white designs from China were particularly prized by Dutch and European elites. The decline of the Ming dynasty following the death of the Wanli Emperor negatively impacted Sino-Dutch trade, including earthenware, to the extent that Dutch merchants decided the only solution was to produce such objects locally.

One such manufacturer was David Anthonisz van der Pieth, who founded De Porceleyne Fles ("the Porcelain Bottle") in 1653. From then until the late 18th century, the company produced earthenware for clients around the Netherlands and Europe. Delftware ranged from simple household items – plain white earthenware with little or no decoration – to fancy artwork. Pictorial plates were made in abundance, illustrated with religious motifs, native Dutch scenes with windmills and fishing boats, hunting scenes, landscapes and seascapes. Competition from the European porcelain industry, however, was fierce and by 1840, De Porceleyne Fles was the last factory remaining, all other competitors having ceased operations.

In 1876, Joost Thooft bought the factory with the aim to revive the production of Delftware. Together with Leo Senf, he worked to modernise operations and produce products that would be able to compete with European manufacturers. Thooft developed the trademark that is applied to all hand-painted Royal Delft items. After Thooft's death in 1890, owner Abel Labouchere helmed the company, overseeing the centralisation of production from dispersed locations around the city to the current factory location in 1916.

In 1919, the Dutch royal house awarded the company the right to add the prefix Koninklijke (Royal) to its name, a sign of appreciation for the company's efforts to preserve an important Dutch industry. To this day, the company maintains a close relation with the Dutch royal family.

== Gallery of images ==
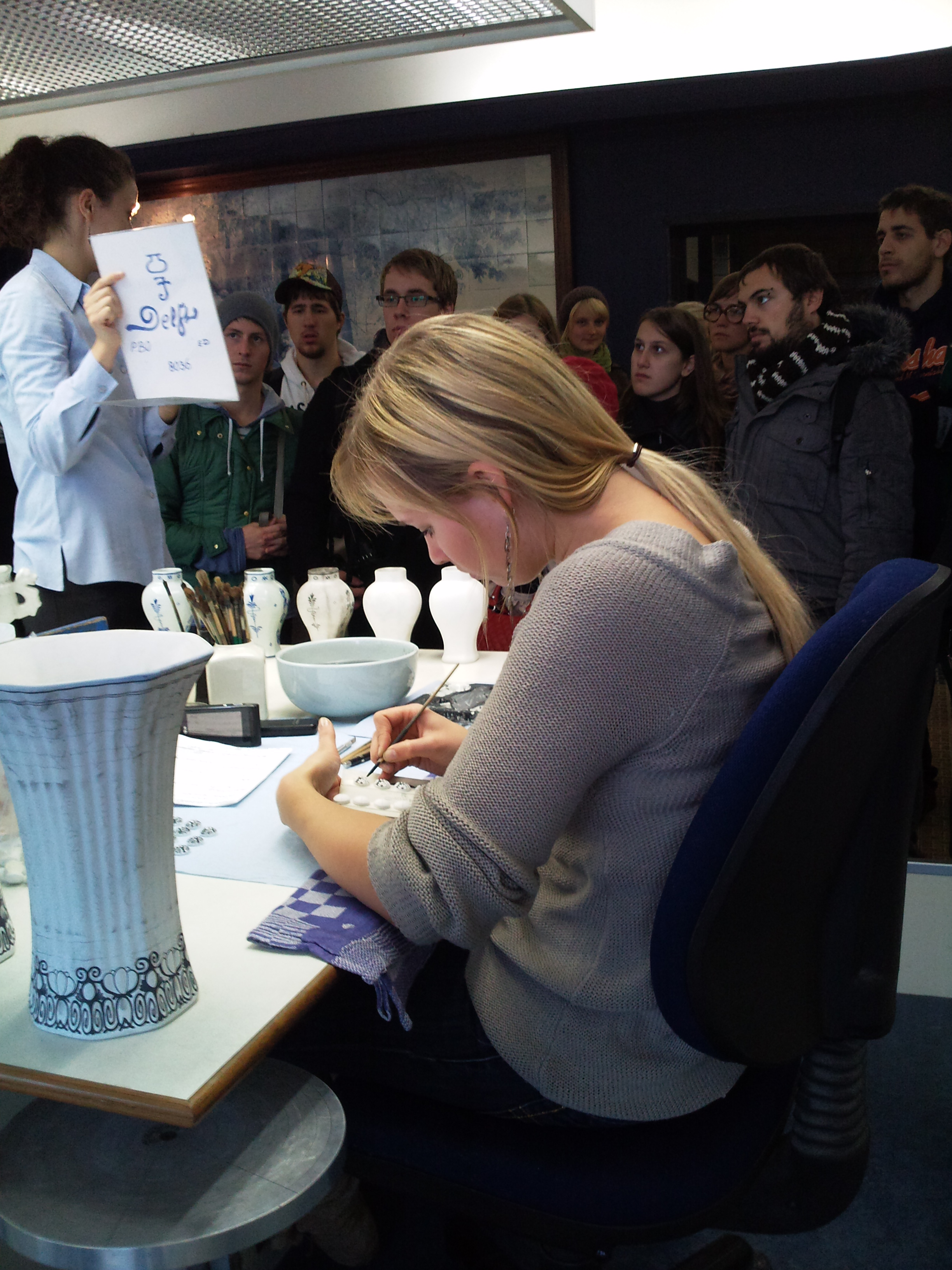
Delft painter at work on object

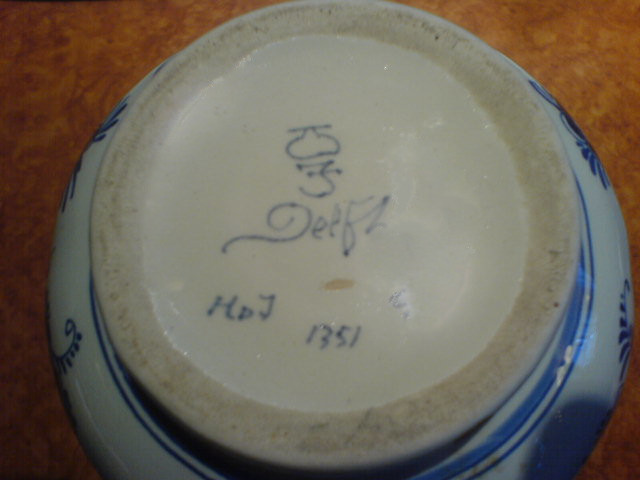
Trademark of Delft Blue item

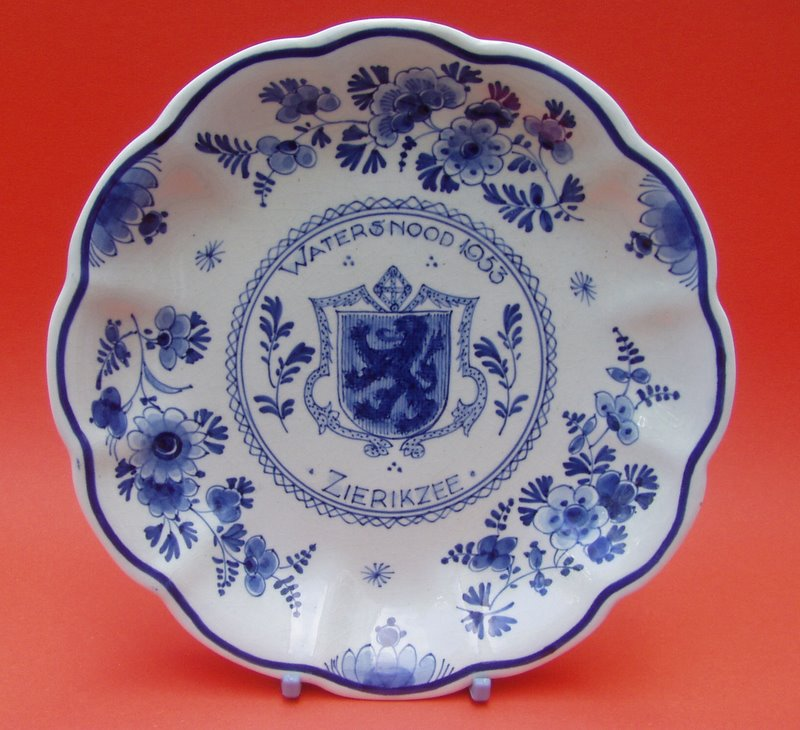
Example of Royal Delft work

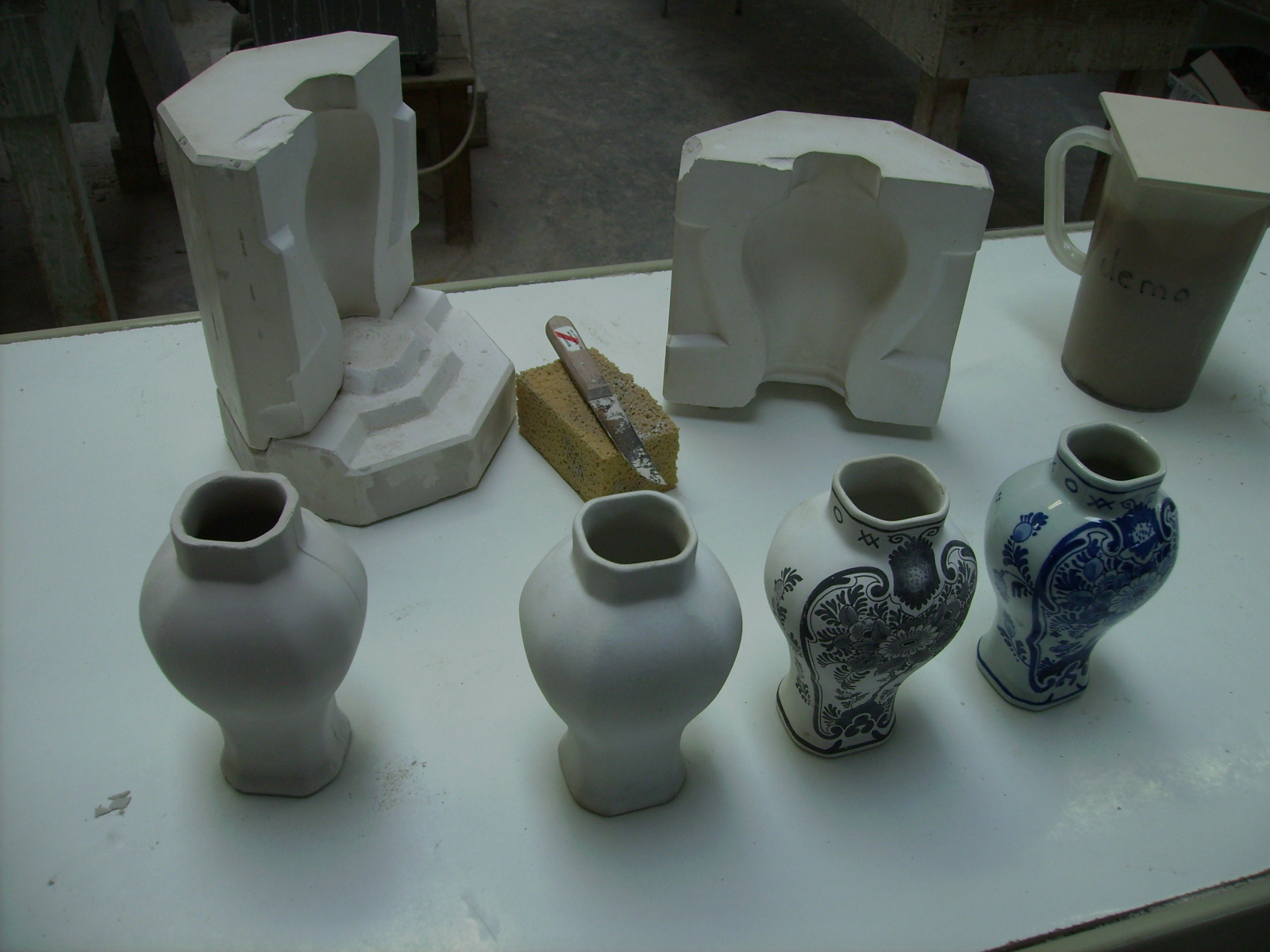
Different phases of the manufacturing process

== See also ==
- List of oldest companies
