= Deiss =

Deiss is a German and Swiss German surname. It may be a spelling variant of Deis, which is a shorhened form of Mattheis (Matthias) Notable people with the surname include:

- Joseph Deiss, President of Switzerland in 2004
- Joseph Jay Deiss (1912–1999), American writer
- Lucien Deiss (1921–2007), French priest and composer
- Deiss family of wine producers, owners of Marcel Deiss

== See also ==
- Deuss
