= Deuss =

Deuss or Deuß is a German surname. Notable people with the surname include:

- Arwen Deuss (born 1975), Dutch geophysicist
- Hans Deuss (born 1948), Dutch realist painter
- John Deuss (born 1942), Dutch businessman and oil trader

== See also ==
- Deiss
