= Caroline Prisse =

'Jonkvrouw Caroline Emmanuelle (Caroline) Prisse is a Dutch artist. Her work is included in the collection of Corning Museum of Glass.

== Biography ==
Prisse was born in Belgium, and studied visual arts and then glass arts at Gerrit Rietveld Academie in Amsterdam, the Netherlands. She has exhibited at Musee Wurth Strassbourg and Gemeentemuseum Den Haag.

Prisse has held the position of director of glass training at Gerrit Rietveld Academie and from 2014 to 2018 she was the director of Van Tetterode Glass Studio in Amsterdam.
