= Bookmarc =

Marc Jacobs bookstore chain

Bookmarc (stylized as BOOKMARC) is a bookstore chain founded and operated by the luxury fashion brand Marc Jacobs. It opened its first location on Bleecker Street in Manhattan in 2010 and subsequently opened other locations in Tokyo, London, and Paris. A bookstore and event space, its locations sell art and photography books, as well as branded merchandise. Its locations have also hosted events and exhibitions with Kendall Jenner, Takashi Murakami, and others in the fashion industry.

== History ==
In 2010, Marc Jacobs and Brian Duffy opened two Bookmarc locations: one in New York City and one in Los Angeles. The New York location occupied the storefront where another bookstore, Biography Book Shop, used to be and was part of a string of six Marc Jacobs storefronts opened simultaneously in the West Village. The bookstore's opening was deemed controversial by some locals according to Publishers Weekly and The New York Times. Bookmarc sections were also later installed into existing Marc Jacobs storefronts across the United States.

In 2012, Marc Jacobs opened Bookmarc locations in Paris and London. In 2013, the brand opened another Bookmarc location in Shibuya ward of Tokyo, designed by Jaklitsch/Gardner Architects. The same year, Marc Jacobs collaborated with Brooklyn artist Wes Lang on a limited-edition gold stationery product. In 2016, several Marc Jacobs stores in Los Angeles closed, including Bookmarc.

During the COVID-19 pandemic, the bookstore closed down and instead facilitated online programming through Instagram Live, specifically a question-and-answer segment that ran every Thursday; one segment featured model Tonne Goodman in conversation with fashion editor Wendy Goodman.

== Events ==
In 2012, Kate Moss signed copies of her book, Kate: The Kate Moss Book, at the London location, which drew Stella McCartney, Boy George, Pedro Almodóvar, Florence Welch, and other attendees.

In 2015, the Manhattan location hosted an event with Kendall Jenner, Emily Ratajkowski, and Gigi Hadid for a LOVE Magazine signing to benefit Designers Against Aids.

In 2017, actor Shota Matsuda debuted his photography book Careering at the Tokyo location; the event also featured a live music set and a photo exhibition. The same year, Marie-Amélie Sauvé, the T Magazine fashion director, signed copies of Mastermind Magazine's second issue at a launch event in the Manhattan location; Heidi Klum also hosted a signing for her book, Heidi Klum by Rankin.

In 2018, the Ukiyo-e Project, in collaboration with Brian Duffy and Terry O'Neill, showcased an exhibition featuring David Bowie in a woodblock printing style at the bookstore.

In 2019, Goodman hosted a launch for her book, Point of View, at the Manhattan location which was attended by Anna Wintour, Hadid, and others. The same year, Takashi Murakami and Verdy showcased an art exhibition at the Tokyo location.

In September of 2023, the Manhattan location hosted several events. Carine Roitfeld celebrated the launch of Fantasies: Carine Roitfeld Fashion Book, her book published by Rizzoli. Linda Evangelista and Steven Meisel launched their coffee table book, Linda Evangelista Photographed by Steven Meisel. Sofia Coppola hosted a book signing for Sofia Coppola Archive: 1999-2023.
