= Lalou =

Lalou is a given name and surname. Notable people with the name include:

- Lalou Bize-Leroy (born 1932), French businesswoman
- Marcelle Lalou (1890–1967), French Tibetologist
- Maria Lalou (born 1977), Greek contemporary conceptual artist
