= Carlgren =

Carlgren is a Swedish surname. Notable people with the surname include:

- Andreas Carlgren (born 1958), Swedish politician
- Anna Carlgren (born 1960), Swedish glass artist
- Erik Carlgren (born 1946), Swedish sprinter
- Patrik Carlgren (born 1992), Swedish footballer
