= Hansje =

Hansje is a Dutch feminine given name. It is a short form and diminutive of Johanna and Hans.

People with the name include:

- Hansje Bunschoten (1958–2017), Dutch freestyle swimmer
- Hansje van Halem (born 1978), Dutch graphic designer and type designer
