= Lita Cabellut =

Spanish multidisciplinary artist

- Born: 1961 (age 64–65); Sariñena, Aragon, Spain
- Education: Gerrit Rietveld Academy
- Known for: Painting
- Awards: Fuera de serie de las Artes Award (2018)
- Elected: Artist of the Year 2021 in The Netherlands
- Website: www.litacabellut.com

Lita Cabellut (born 1961) is a Spanish multidisciplinary artist who lives and works in The Hague, Netherlands. Cabellut works on large scale canvases using a contemporary variation of the fresco technique.

== Early life and education ==
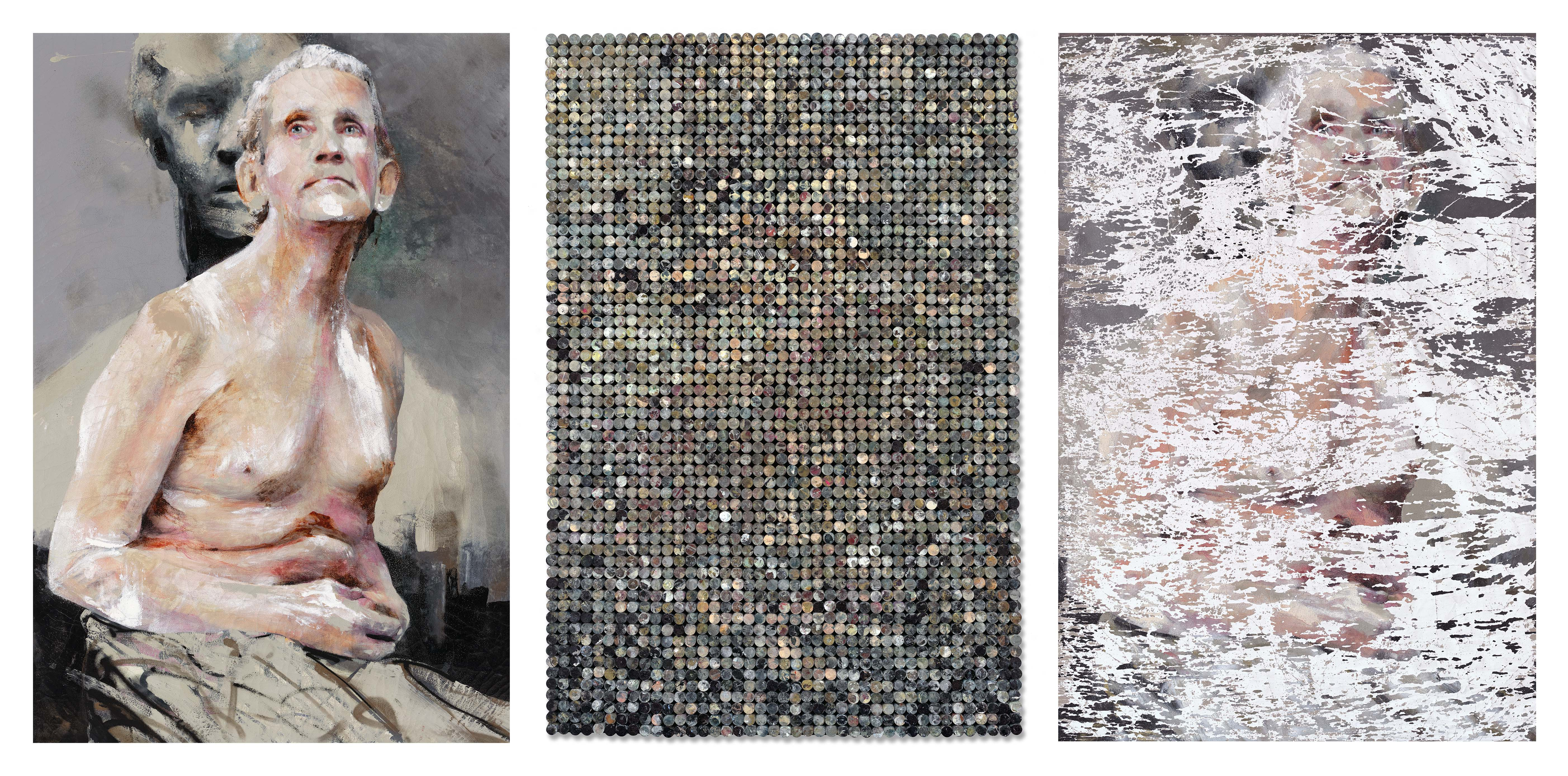
Kumbha, from the series A Chronicle of the Infinite, 2018

Lita Cabellut was born in 1961 in Sariñena, a village in Aragon, Spain. She moved to Barcelona as a child, where her mother ran a brothel. She was left under the care of her grandmother but spent most of her days on the streets selling "imaginary stars". When her grandmother died, Cabellut went to live in an orphanage.

At the age of twelve she was adopted by a Catalan family. During this new period she discovered the Prado Museum and became inspired by the paintings of Goya, Velázquez, Ribera and Rembrandt.

Cabellut moved to the Netherlands at the age of 19 to pursue her studies at the Gerrit Rietveld Academy in Amsterdam, where she studied between 1982 and 1984. During these years her work would be influenced by the Dutch masters, and she developed some of the artist techniques that have become her distinguishing mark.

== Work ==
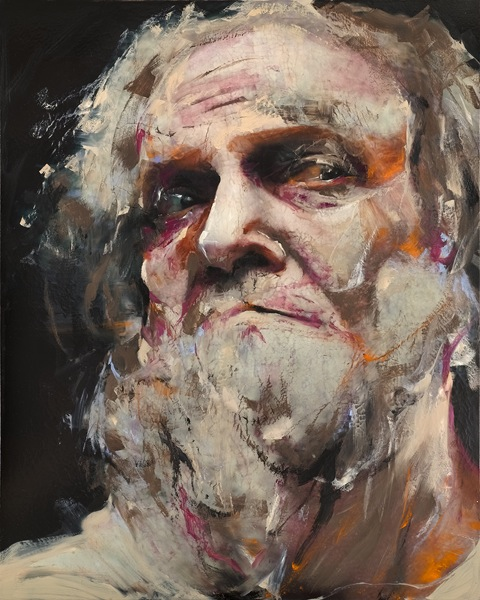
Don Quijote 08

=== Art techniques ===
Working on large-scale canvases, Spanish artist Lita Cabellut is known for a contemporary variation of the classic fresco technique. Cabellut is also a multi-disciplinary artist whose works also include drawings on paper, sculptures, photography, scenography, installations, poetry, visual poems and videos.

=== Collections ===
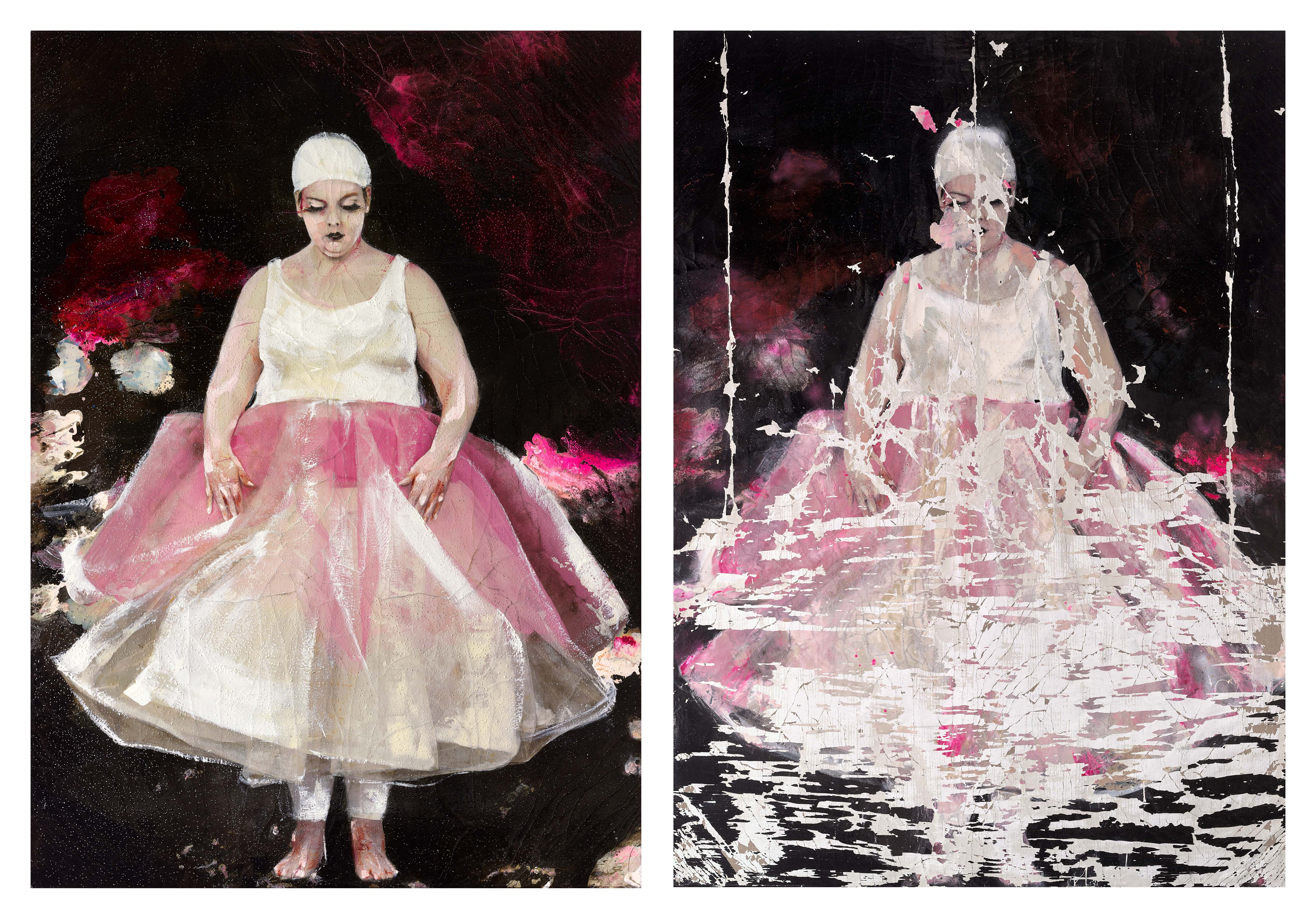
Miquiztli, from the series A Chronicle of the Infinite, 2018

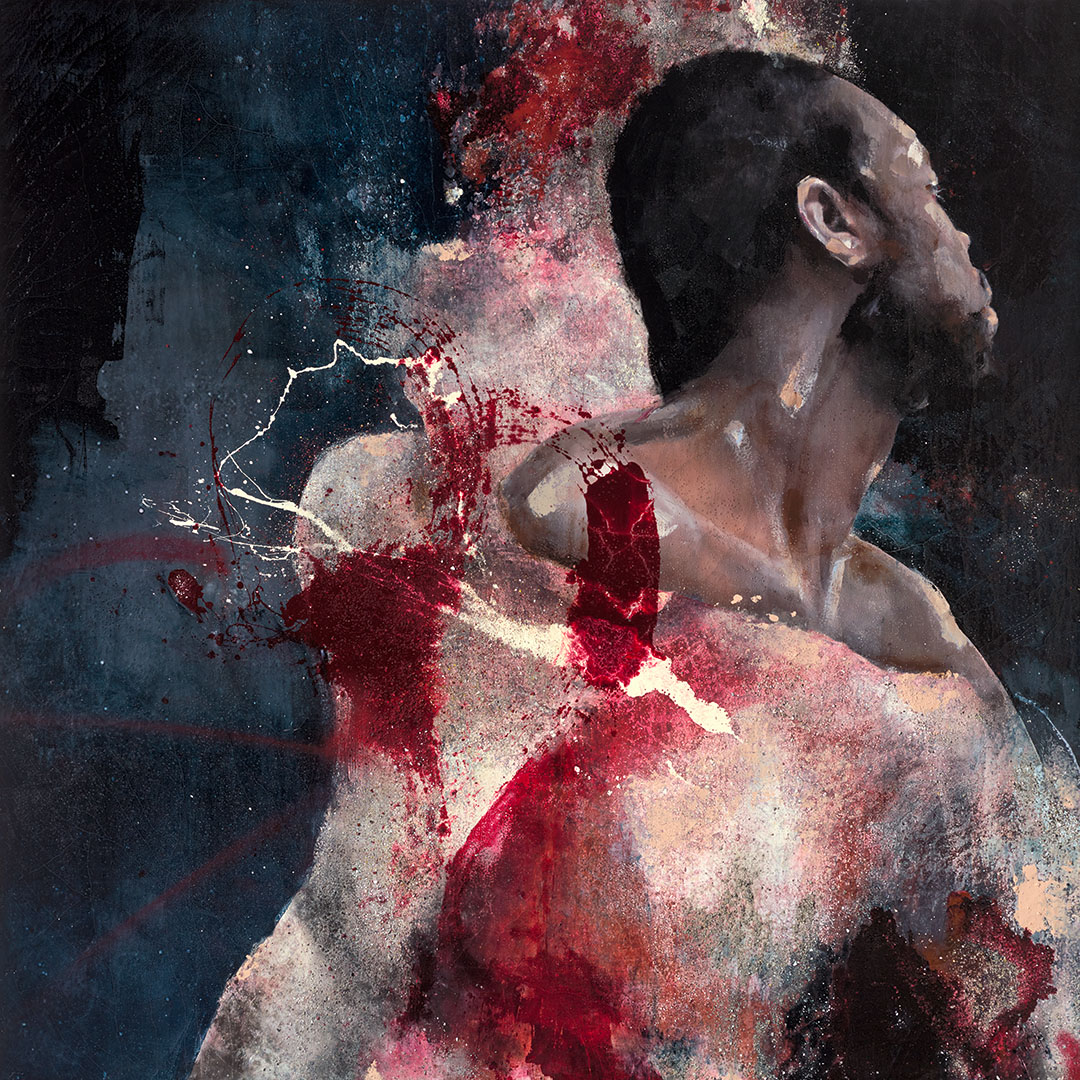
Antares, from the series A Chronicle of the Infinite, 2018

Cabellut's work is grouped conceptually in collections or series of paintings. The collection Frida, The Black Pearl (2010) pays tribute to Mexican artist Frida Kahlo, in which Cabellut depicts Kahlo's life while including many of her own experiences. This series inspired Cabellut to create “Coco, The Testimony of Black and White” (2011), a collection that portrays this fashion icon through 35 large-scale portraits. “A Portrait of Human knowledge” (2012) continues Cabellut's previous work with portraits of some of the most influential icons of knowledge from the past 150 years, including Stravinsky, Nureyev, Marie Curie, Billie Holiday, Federico Garcia Lorca, Rudolf Steiner and Sigmund Freud.

With The Trilogy of the Doubt, a collection composed by socially inspired triptych paintings about power, injustice and ignorance, Cabellut received attention both in her native Spain in The Netherlands. The portrait collection “Dried Tear” (2013) expresses Cabellut's fascination and admiration for Asian culture. Cabellut's series about the Dutch Golden Age entitled “The Black Tulip” (2014) was inspired by one of the most famous national symbols of the Netherlands.

For her collection Blind Mirror (2015), Cabellut explored culture and religion, focusing on some of the most influential religions that have been known to humanity.

== Awards and recognition ==
- 2011: Premio de Cultura Gitana de Pintura y Artes Plásticas (Gypsy Culture Award for Paint and Plastic Arts) by Instituto de Cultura Gitana (Institute of Gypsy Culture), in recognition to the work done in benefit of this group's culture anywhere in the world
- 2015: Invited to be on the jury of the Premios Figurativas por la Fundació Privada de les Arts i els Artistes, an annual artistic prize dedicated to promoting figurative art
- 2015: Placed as 333rd position in the "top 500" of the most famous contemporary artists in the world, by Artprice magazine, which was recognised Cabellut as the most well-known Spanish female artist
- 2017: IX Premio Time-Out Barcelona, for her contribution to the promotion of the city of Barcelona through her much-visited retrospective exhibition at the Fundació Vila Casas
- 2018: Fuera de serie de las Artes Award in Madrid
- 2020: Artist of the Year 2021 in The Netherlands

== Exhibitions ==
Since her first exhibition at the Town Hall of El Masnou, Barcelona, in 1978, Cabellut's work has been exhibited all around the world, including New York, Dubai, Miami, Singapore, Hong Kong, Barcelona, London, Paris, Venice, Monaco and Seoul.

Some of her solo museum exhibitions include:

- 2020 - Black Tulip, Museum de Zwarte Tulp, Lisse, The Netherlands
- 2019 - The Victory of Silence, Goya Museum, Zaragoza, Spain
- 2018 - A Chronicle of the Infinite, Museum Jan van der Togt, Amstelveen, The Netherlands
- 2017 - Testimonio, Museo de Arte Contemporáneo Gas Natural Fenosa, Coruña, Spain
- 2017 - Retrospectiva, Espais Volart, Fundació Vila Casas, Barcelona, Spain
- 2015 - Black Tulip: The Golden Age, CSMVS (formally the Prince of Wales Museum), Bombay, India
- 2015 - Black Tulip: The Golden Age, Lalit Kala A kademi, New Delhi, India
- 2015 - Blind Mirror, Hälsingland Museum, Hudiksvall, Sweden.
- 2014 - Here to Stay, Kunststation Kleinsassen, Berlin, Germany
- 2013 - Trilogy of Doubt, NoordBrabants Museum, Den Bosch, The Netherlands
- 2013 - La trilogia de la Duda, Espai Volart, Fundació Vila Casas, Barcelona, Spain
