= Deis =

Deis may refer to:

== People ==
- Eric Deis (born 1979), Canadian photographer
- Matt Deis (born 1983), American bass guitarist
- Tyler Deis (born 1974), Canadian ice hockey player

== Other ==
- Delivering Equality of Opportunity in Schools (DEIS or Deis), a programme of the Department of Education of Ireland
- Deis, a character in Breath of Fire
