= Carla van de Puttelaar =

Dutch artist and historian (born 1967)

Carla van de Puttelaar (born 1 November 1967) is a Dutch fine art photographer and art historian based in Amsterdam.

== Biography ==
Van de Puttelaar was born in Zaandam, the Netherlands. She studied at the Rietveld Academie in Amsterdam from 1991 to 1996 and obtained a PhD in art history from Utrecht University in 2017. Between 2011 and 2014, she served as a faculty member at the Royal Academy of Art, The Hague.

Her photographic work specializes in portrait photography and nudes, while her academic research focuses on Dutch and Scottish seventeenth- and early-eighteenth century portraiture. She authored ‘Scottish Portraiture 1644-1714’, published by Brepols in December 2021.

In 2017, van de Puttelaar initiated the portrait project Artfully Dressed: Women in the Art World, which comprises over 550 portraits of women engaged in various art disciplines as museum curators and directors, to art collectors and artists.

Van de Puttelaar's work has been widely exhibited, including a retrospective exhibition titled ‘Brushed by Light’ at the National Museum of History and Art in Luxembourg in 2020. The exhibition featured 78 works spanning 22 years and was accompanied by a catalog with an introduction by art historian Rudi Ekkart. In 2021, she collaborated with Iris van Herpen on the project and exhibition Synergia

== Work ==
Van de Puttelaar’s photography is often compared to that of Rineke Dijkstra and Hellen van Meene due to its resemblance to Dutch Golden Age paintings in terms of composition, light, and texture. While she initially worked with film, she has transitioned to digital photography. Many of her photographs are untitled, enhancing a sense of distance and mystery while subtly conveying intimacy and sensuality.

== Recognition ==
Van de Puttelaar has received several awards, including the Dutch Prix de Rome Basic Prize. Her work has been exhibited in major cities such as New York, Paris, and Brussels. Additionally, her photographs have been featured as book covers and in publications like The New Yorker and The New York Times Magazine. In 2009, she was ranked 51st in the top 100 Dutch artists by Elsevier. She was also a semi-finalist in the Artist of the Year contest organized by Stichting Kunstweek in 2018, 2019, and 2023.

== Bibliography ==
- Carla van de Puttelaar. Tekst/text Rudy Kousbroek (2004) ISBN 90-75574-23-1
- Galateas. With an introduction by Kristien Hemmerechts (2008) ISBN 978-2-930537-01-6
- The Beholder's Eye. Text by Bob Frommé (2008) ISBN 978-90-78909-07-1
- Adornments. Text by Marianne Berardi (2017) ISBN 978-2-87985-641-4
- Artfully Dressed: Women in the Art World. Texts by Marta Weiss, Rachel Kaminsky and Carla van de Puttelaar (2019) ISBN 978-19-126903-98
- Brushed by Light. Text by Rudi Ekkart (2020) ISBN 978-94-90119-56-0
- Synergia / Iris van Herpen, Carla van de Puttelaar. Text by Lisa Small (2021) ISBN 978-90-817026-6-9
- Scottish Portraiture 1644-1714, David and John Scougall and Their Contemporaries. Text by Carla van de Puttelaar (2021) ISBN 978-2-503-59727-0
