= Hans Deuss =

Dutch realist painter

Hans Deuss (born Amsterdam, 1948) is a Dutch realist painter. Hans Deuss graduated from the Graphics training at the Gerrit Rietveld Academie in Amsterdam, and started a career in advertising. In 1974 he became a painter.

Hans Deuss' work was part of many expositions of the works of Independent Realists in the Møhlmann museum. His works were also displayed in the Singer Museum in Laren, the Aemstelle Museum in Amstelveen, the Markiezenhof in Bergen op Zoom and the PAN Galerie De Twee Pauwen in The Hague. His work was also displayed abroad in New York, Atlanta, Tokyo, Paris, Antwerp, Strassbourg and Dijon.

== Works ==
The main theme of Hans Deuss' work is landscapes. In his paintings, man can be "sensed" by his absence; only the footsteps are visible. The landscapes are fantasy landscapes with mostly angular architectural shapes that sharply contrast with the organic shapes seen in nature. Nature and Culture are in eternal conflict with each other in Hans Deuss' works. Classically shaped exotic buildings stand in sharp contrast with the advancing foliage: trees and bushes grow through constructions or loom in the distance. Air and water surround the architecture. Stairs lead up or down, and seem to offer an escape out of this constricting situation. His paintings give the viewer a sense of enormous space by a horizon far way, or a window that leads the viewer outside of the picture: it is there that the freedom is.

Nature gives battle to the presence of man. Deuss shows mans urge to destruction and the fight that nature wages to save itself. Eventually, Deuss' paintings seem to tell us, nature will come out victorious, but it will take a very long time. The wind blows seeds in tiny cracks in the structures, from which plants and trees will grow that will eventually engulf the building. Deuss likes to spend time outside of the city in which he lives, and he loves to cycle through the flat polderlandscape around Amsterdam. The ever-expanding city can always be seen looming on the horizon, like an advancing front. Deuss is fascinated by this concept.

The buildings in his paintings are figments of his imagination or based on real building. They can be glimpses of memories of his childhood when he was leafing through old photo albums, or of his travels: for example Mexico, where he visited the ancient Aztec buildings.

The surrealistic buildings are mostly open constructions without roof, windows or doors. Air, water or foliage can be glimpsed through these openings. The buildings are not dilapidated or dirty buildings but look to be carefully conserved and clean. Everything is tidy and structured in the painting of Deuss. This tidiness is enhanced by his painting style: the structures of the walls, the leaves of the trees, everything is painted in excruciating detail.

Deuss studied at the Rietveld academy in Amsterdam, and was taught by Melle and Herman Gordijn. This was where his interest in the Magical Realism was born.
