= Herman Gordijn =

Dutch painter and graphic artist

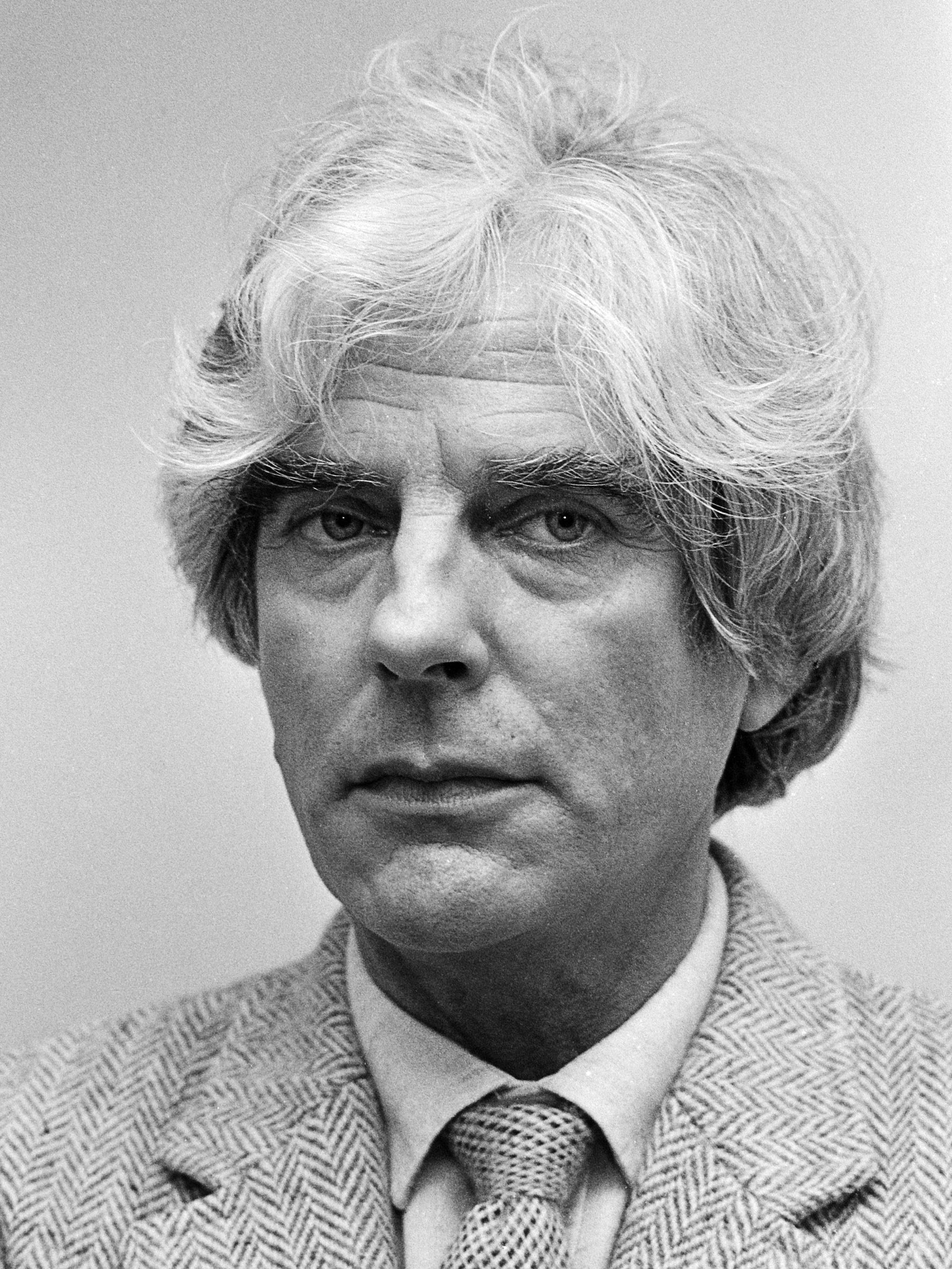
Herman Gordijn (1982)

Herman Gordijn (16 May 1932 — 25 May 2017) was a Dutch painter and graphic artist.

Gordijn was born in The Hague in 1932. He graduated from the Royal Academy of Art and had his first personal exhibition in Kuntstzaal in the Hague in 1958. In 1960, he moved to Amsterdam.

In 1992 Gordijn decided to mainly draw Amsterdam cityscapes, which eventually resulted in the graphic series The Herman Gordijn's Amsterdam (Dutch: Het Amsterdam van Herman Gordijn). In 1997, it was shown as a solo exhibition at Amsterdam Historical Museum. There was also a documentary made at the time about the series which was shown on the national TV.

In 2009, a retrospective of his works was shown in Museum de Fundatie in Zwolle.

At the age of 27, Gordijn was hired by the theater director Walter Kous to develop decorations for his production of the play Suddenly Last Summer by Tennessee Williams. The production was premiered on 10 March 1960 together with another play by Williams, Lord Byron's Love Letter, in which production Gordijn was involved as well. This opened a long career for Gordijn as theater decorator and designer. He participated in 36 productions and stopped in 1969, when he started teaching part-time at Gerrit Rietveld Academie.

Gordijn died on 25 May 2017 at the age of 85, a month before the retrospective exhibition of his works was opened in Museum MORE in Gorssel.
