= Designers Against Aids =

Designers Against Aids (abbreviated DAA) is an international project launched in Belgium in 2004, developed by the non-profit organization Beauty Without Irony, which spreads HIV/AIDS global awareness by using pop culture, celebrities, fashion, and sports to target younger generations, mainly from Western countries. DAA also expresses the need of media coverage on this disease. MTV, New York Post, Vanity Fair, Vogue, Le Monde, Canal+, Cosmopolitan, Knack, El País and International Herald Tribune have reported on DAA and its cause.

== Clothing collections ==
Fashion Against Aids campaigns

DAA is mostly known for their collaboration with fashion company H&M, with whom they launched two "Fashion Against Aids" campaigns in which popular artists designed t-shirts for H&M to raise funds for HIV/AIDS prevention projects, including MTV's "Staying Alive." The collections launched in 2008 and 2009 featured celebrities like Rihanna, Dita Von Teese, N.E.R.D, Timbaland, Moby, Estelle, Tokio Hotel, Yoko Ono, and Katharine Hamnett. 25% of the sales price of the T-shirts are directly donated to MTV Staying Alive, UNFPA, YouthAIDS and Designers Against Aids

DAA clothing collections

Next to the yearly FAA campaigns, DAA regularly releases clothing items that have been designed by notable designers and artists, such as Chicks On Speed, Tim Van Steenbergen, and La Casita de Wendy. These exclusives are sold in shops worldwide. In September 2016, DAA collaborated with a Belgian fashion brand Essentiel Antwerp. The collection was inspired by the clubbing scene and club culture from the 90's to reflect the core of DAA's work. There's also a video tribute made which can be accessed via DAA's website page on this collaboration .

== Education center ==
DAA plans to open its International HIV/AIDS Awareness Education Center in 2010 in Antwerp, Belgium to host students from all over the world and include them in prevention and awareness programs which they can later set up in their own countries.

== Models against AIDS ==
Since 2008, "Models Against Aids" informs young models about the dangers of HIV/AIDS. In addition, some of the models raise funds for DAA projects, take part in campaigns and speak out about the need for HIV/AIDS awareness and prevention.

== Other recent projects ==
July 2008: Exhibition of DAA T-shirts customized by Spanish artists and designers at the International Benicàssim Festival in Spain. September 2008: The proceeds of exclusive denim-themed pieces which were auctioned at the Lee Cooper 100 Years Auction in Paris went to Designers Against Aids (and Red Cross France). October 2008: A perfume line named Six Scents is launched to raise money for the IHAEC. Six fragrances are produced by Symrise, Metaproject and Joseph Quartana (Seven New York). June 2009: DAA releases a bedlinen collection in Europe, manufactured by Mistral Home Textiles. The duvet covers and pillowcases are designed by celebrities such as Vive la fête, Bas Kosters, Kate Ryan and Percy Irausquin. The proceeds will again be donated to the International HIV/AIDS Awareness Education Center.
