= Anneke Schat =

Dutch goldsmith and visual artist

- Anneke Schat at work
- Born: Anna Jacoba Elisabeth Portegijs; 27 June 1942; Amsterdam, Netherlands
- Died: 19 December 2024 (aged 82); Ede, Netherlands
- Education: Instituut voor Kunstnijverheidsonderwijs
- Years active: 1965-2024
- Spouse: Rudolph Schat
- Website: https://annekeschat.nl/

Anna Jacoba Elisabeth (Anneke) Schat-Portegijs (Amsterdam, 27 juni 1942 – Ede, 19 december 2024) was a Dutch goldsmith and visual artist.

Movement and natural shapes are central elements in the style of her jewellery, sculptures, and paintings on paper and linen. The designs of her artworks were often inspired by Japanese calligraphy techniques.

Anneke Schat designed and created the Dutch television award de Gouden Televizier-Ring every year from 1975 until 2024, as well as the current, permanent form of the award.

“The path of inspiration and concentration expresses itself in forms searching for freedom.” – Anneke Schat

== Biography ==
=== Early life and education ===
Anneke Schat-Portegijs was born in Amsterdam in 1942, as the daughter of Elisabeth Landkroon (a sister of painter Piet Landkroon) and Jacob Portegijs, one of the first professional projectionists in the Netherlands.

From 1959 until her graduation in 1964, she studied at the Instituut voor Kunstnijverheidsonderwijs (Institute for Arts and Crafts Education, later Gerrit Rietveld Academie) in the evenings. She was taught goldsmithing by, amongst others, Karel Niehorster and Anton de Vries, and her sculpture classes for spatial planning were taught by Carel Kneulman.

In 1963, Anneke married gemstone specialist Rudolph Schat and chose “Anneke Schat” as her artist name. (“Schat” literally translates as “treasure”, which makes it a fitting name for a goldsmith.) Her birth name remained visible in her maker’s mark A.S.P.: Anneke Schat-Portegijs. The Schats rented a storey of Spiegelgracht 20A in Amsterdam. Their downstairs neighbour offered up some space in her shop window, which was the start of Anneke’s own gallery for modern jewellery. Anneke and Rudolph Schat bought the building in 1971. With a background of working at the jewellery store of Karel Citroen, Rudolph started managing Anneke Schat’s business affairs by the end of the 1970s.

Cicada Viventi I (2014): Silver chain bracelet with agate

=== Sources of inspiration ===
In 1978, Anneke Schat started calligraphy lessons with sensei Hideko Satori, affiliated with the Nihon Shodo Bijutu academy in Tokyo. From that moment on, Japanese calligraphy was an important influence on Schat’s paintings as well as on her modern jewellery. In 2024, Schat achieved the ninth (second-highest) dan at Nihon Shodo Bijutu academy.

Anneke and Rudolph Schat travelled together to study specific goldsmithing traditions, natural phenomena, and historical as well as modern artistic expressions. They started out backpacking through the Balkans and ended up visiting every continent. Anneke and Rudolph often returned to the garrigue in southern France, where they observed spiders and their cobwebs for Bridging the Wind in the summer of 1993.

“Many people think that I get my inspiration while travelling, but that’s not how it works. The inspiration is there to start with, but it only becomes organised when I’m totally removed from my familiar surroundings. I always describe it as pieces of a puzzle which fall into place, and that can only happen if I go away.” – Anneke Schat

In 1979, Schat acquired a second workshop at the edge of the forest of De Hoge Veluwe National Park, where she could withdraw in peace, away from Amsterdam’s noise and bustle. The big garden inspired her as well, and her use of the colour yellow became connected to the blooming Hamamelis. In 2020, Anneke and Rudolph Schat permanently moved to the house and workshop in Gelderland. In 2021, the new owner of Spiegelgracht 20A had a gable stone carved by Tobias Snoep to honour the artist who’d lived and worked there for 55 years.

Anneke Schat always meticulously documented her work and published her inspirations and exhibitions in books. Her archive can be consulted via Stichting Anneke Schat-Portegijs.

The Fanned-Out Circle (2003): 18 carat gold brooch and pendant with diamond, ruby, and sapphires

== Artistic style ==
“An artist regards a pile of gold with the same eyes as a pile of sand.” – Anneke Schat

In her treatment of precious metals, Anneke Schat-Portegijs tested artistic and technical limits by unravelling shapes and creating a multitude of different textures. The meaning she assigned to her work was firmly rooted in ancient knowledge and universal spiritual symbolism. Her expressive language of form was focused on movement and the recurring rhythms of nature. She found inspiration in travelling as well as in her own garden and in the arts. For example, her multifaceted take on a “horizon” aligned with Dutch landscape art. The ever-returning circle, with its centre outside of space and time, expressed her fascination for East Asian art, culture, and philosophy.

The spatial objects, intrinsically created as wearable items, are constructed asymmetrically out of a variety of silver and gold elements. With or without the subtle or exuberant addition of pearls and/or gemstones, the sculptural object always catches and reflects the light in a dynamic manner.

Painting "Restless Butterflies" (1997), mixed media on linen

The end of the 1970s, when Anneke Schat-Portegijs immersed herself in calligraphy and aquarelle painting, marked the start of an interaction between her modern jewellery and her paintings. In this regard, she felt a sense of kinship with the Chinese painter Zao Wou-Ki. The increasing intensity of the autonomous works on paper, with a language of form that was characterised by a “lyrical, poetic grammar” in the late 1980s, was accompanied by a greater spatiality in her jewellery and, in the 1990s, by monumental work in steel.

Until her final days, Anneke Schat-Portegijs continued further development and expansion of this adventurous artistic practice, consistently characterised by freedom and experimentation.

“In chaos I'm not leaving anything to chance.” – Anneke Schat

== Collections ==
Anneke Schat’s works are held in the collections of the Schmuckmuseum Pforzheim, CODA Apeldoorn, and Rijksmuseum Amsterdam.

Mutation in Reflection (2009): 18 carat gold ring with rutilated quartz and pink sapphire

== Solo exhibitions (a selection) ==
- 1969, 1980, 1982: Galerie Kunstforum, Schelderode
- 1985, 1988: Galerie Aan de Kippenlijn, Lunteren
- 1989, 1999: Singer Museum, Laren
- 2007: Pulchri Studio, The Hague
- 2007, 2013, 2018-2019: Museum Jan van der Togt / Museum Jan, Amstelveen

== Recognition ==
- 1965: Honourable mention of her submission to Cellini-Wettbewerb, Berlin
- 1971: Award from the Federation Gold and Silver (Federatie Goud en Zilver) for Schat’s entire contribution to the group exhibition “Shape in Precious Metal” (“Vorm in Edelmetaal”), Dutch Gold, Silver and Clock Museum Utrecht (Nederlands Goud-, Zilver- en Klokkenmuseum Utrecht)
- 1979: Judges’ Prize for necklace in category ‘Creative Design’, 7th International Pearl Design Contest Tokyo, Japan Pearl Promotion Society
- 1995: Municipality of Ede Culture Award (Cultuurprijs Gemeente Ede)
- 2005: Granted knighthood in the Order of Orange-Nassau, Ede
- 2015: Design of the Media Diamant plaque and certificates for Stichting Media Diamant, Hilversum
- 2016: Design of the Piket Art Award (Piket Kunstprijs), The Hague
- 2024: Awarded with the Media Diamant on the Diamant Muur by Stichting Media Diamant, Hilversum

== Bibliography ==
- Hoijtink, Mirjam (1994), Anneke Schat. Edelsmeedkunst en werken op papier. Actuele onderwerpen AO: edelsmeedkunst, no. 2536, Stichting IVIO, Lelystad
- Hoijtink, Mirjam (1995), In het teken van Satyridae / The Sign of Satyridae. Anneke Schat, exhibition catalogue, De Brink, Amsterdam
- Mokveld, Monique (1987), Anneke Schat–Edelsmeedkunst / Modern Jewellery, Ploegsma, Amsterdam
- Mokveld, Monique (1992), Anneke Schat. De weg van het gras / The Way of the Grass, exhibition catalogue, De Brink, Amsterdam
- Redeker, Hans (1982), Kunstpocket Anneke Schat Serie 2 / N. 12, Kunstforum, Schelderode
- Schat, Anneke (1999), Communicatie in het venster van de tijd / Communication through a Window of Time, exhibition catalogue, Singer Museum, Laren, De Brink, Amsterdam
- Schat, Anneke (2001), Het juweel van de aardbei. Hommage aan de triptiek ‘Tuin der lusten’ van Jheronimus Bosch, De Brink, Amsterdam
- Schat, Anneke (2001), Vuur is mijn penseel (gebundelde lezingen), De Brink, Amsterdam
- Schat, Anneke (2007), In oorsprong cirkel / Beginning with a Circle, exhibition catalogue, Pulchri Studio, 's-Gravenhage
- Schat, Anneke (2010), Ontwerp en uitvoering. De Gouden Televizier-Ring. De ringhistorie van het programmablad Televizier 1964-2010, Avro/Televizier, Hilversum
- Schat, Anneke (2013), Metaforen van de wind / Metaphors of the Wind, exhibition catalogue, Museum Jan van der Togt, Amstelveen
- Schat, Anneke (2019), Inspirerende Filmmomenten / Inspiring Movie Moments, exhibition catalogue, Museum Jan, Amstelveen
- Schat, Anneke and Rudolph (2026), De weg van het Penseel op papier en linnen / The Way of the Brush on Paper and Linen, exhibition catalogue, Museum Lunteren, Ede
- Straus, Cees (1984), Piramidaal. Edelsmeedkunst - Anneke Schat, Galerie Gamma, Amsterdam
- Straus, Cees (1989), Anneke Schat. Horizon in beweging / Horizons in Motion, exhibition catalogue, Singer Museum, Laren, Ploegsma, Amsterdam
- Straus, Cees (1994), Enteren op de wind / Bridging the Wind. Anneke Schat, exhibition catalogue, De Brink, Amsterdam
