= Abdul Vas =

Venezuelan artist (born 1981)

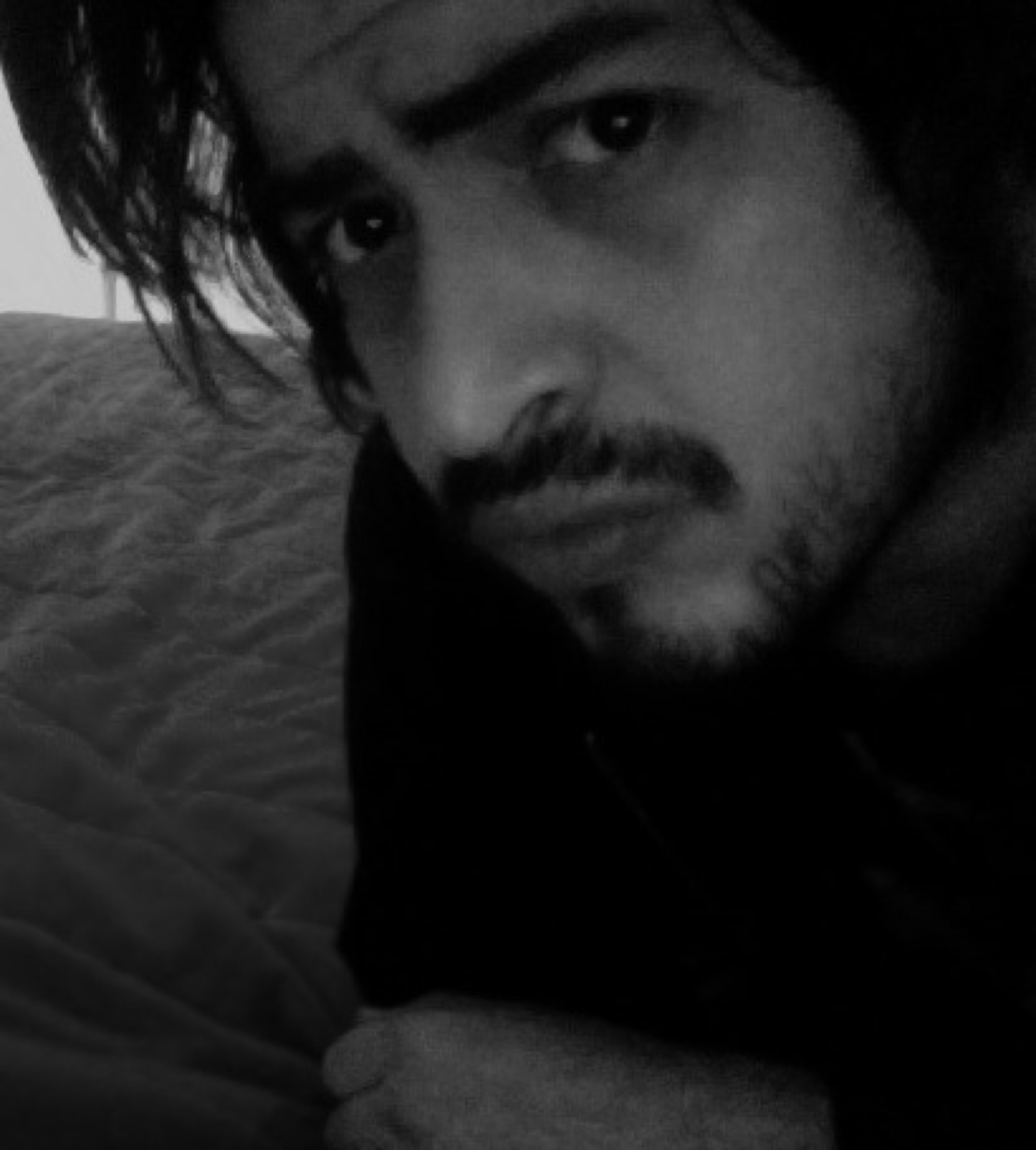
- Abdul Vas, 2012
- Born: 15 March 1981 (age 45); Maracay, Venezuela
- Education: Gerrit Rietveld Academie
- Known for: Contemporary art, Painting, Drawing, Rock n' Roll, Installation art, Sculpture
- Movement: Contemporary art
- Patrons: AC/DC, MLB, Marc Chagall, Mike Kelley, James Ensor, Al Feldstein, Brian Johnson, Hieronymus Bosch, Angus Young

Abdul Vas (born 15 March 1981 in Maracay, Venezuela) is a contemporary artist. He grew up living between Suriname, Guyana, and Belgium. After studies at EAVRA in Maracay and at the Gerrit Rietveld Academie in Amsterdam he lives and works in Amsterdam and Madrid. He has created handmade books and zines, photographs, collages, drawings, paintings and murals.

Vas's work has been discussed and reviewed in Vice, Rolling Stone, ABC (newspaper), Esquire, and The New York Times. In 2009, he was selected for the Beijing Biennale. His works are part of various collections internationally, and have been exhibited throughout the United States, Latin America, Asia and Europe.

== Work ==
Abdul Vas work broaches heavily the obsessions of his home country Venezuela with the symbols of the American dream. Heavily influenced by Marc Chagall, Mike Kelley, Al Feldstein and James Ensor, Vas's work heavily consists of depictions of aggressive and well-hung roosters that represent the masculine element of the American cowboy-culture. Therefore, his pictures are full of references to the American baseball team Cincinnati Reds, MLB, Malcolm Young, the Rolling Stones, Slayer, Metallica, the Black Crowes, Muddy Waters, SUVs, rock and roll and the symbols of the North American imperialist power: the Navistar trucks. Another common theme in his work is the Australian rock group AC/DC, particularly lead singer Brian Johnson. Many of his other artworks are named after AC/DC songs or albums.
