= Henk Krijger =

Dutch artist (1914–1979)

Hendrik (Henk) Cornelis Krijger, also known as Senggih (19 November 1914 – 27 September 1979) was a Dutch artist.

Krijger was born in Karoeni on the island of Sumba, then part of the Dutch East Indies. He moved to the Netherlands in 1928, and studied at the Instituut voor Kunstnijverheidsonderwijs. Krijger lived in the Netherlands the rest of his life, apart from the period 1969 to 1973, when he served as Master Artist of the Institute for Christian Art/Patmos Workshop and Gallery, first in Chicago and then in Toronto. He participated in the Dutch Resistance in World War II.

Krijger worked in a variety of media, including drawing, painting, print, and sculpture. He was a member of the Haagse Kunstkring. Peter Enneson describes Krijger as a "maverick" and notes that he was self-consciously both Christian and expressionist.

== Gallery ==
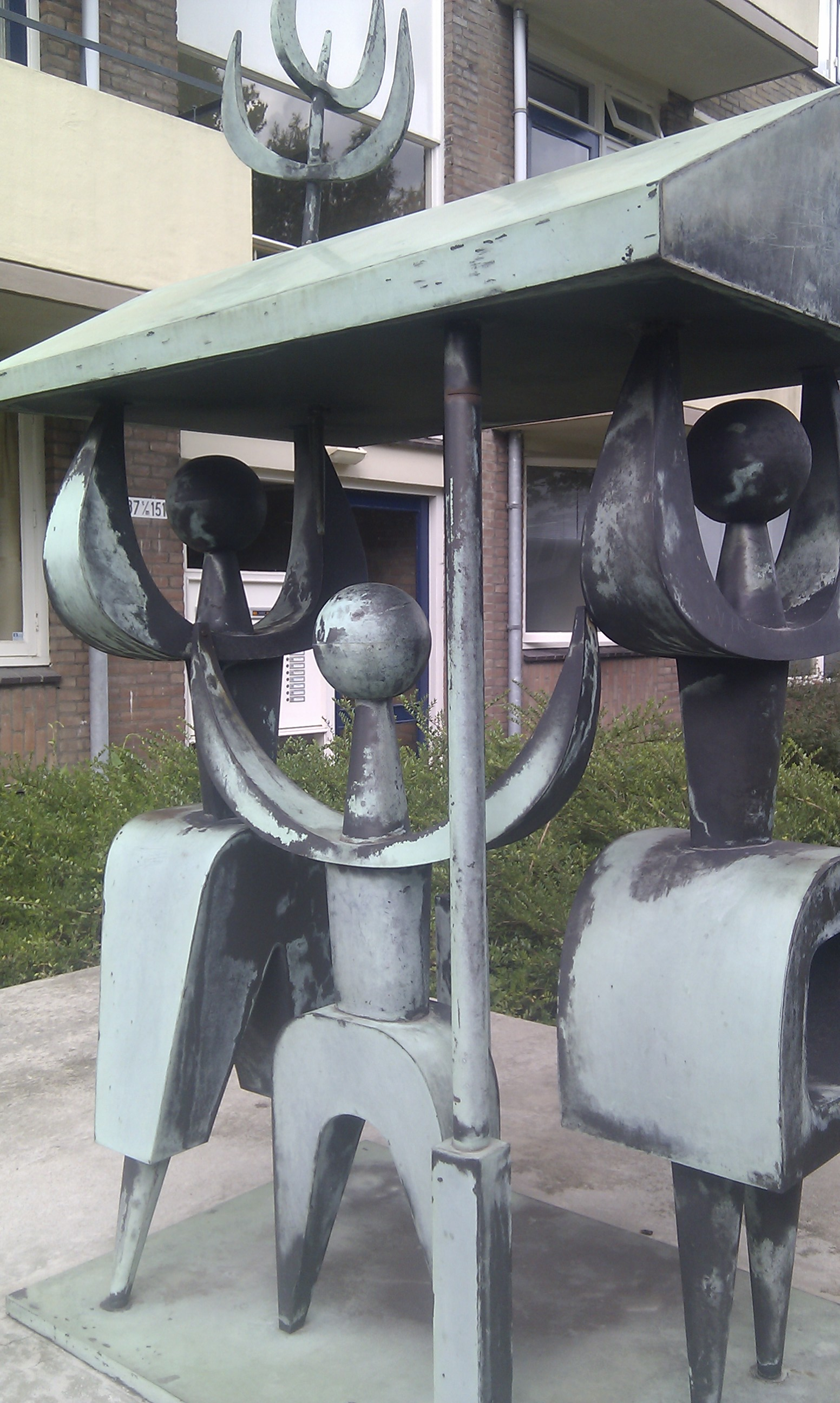
Het Gezin (1964) in Zwolle

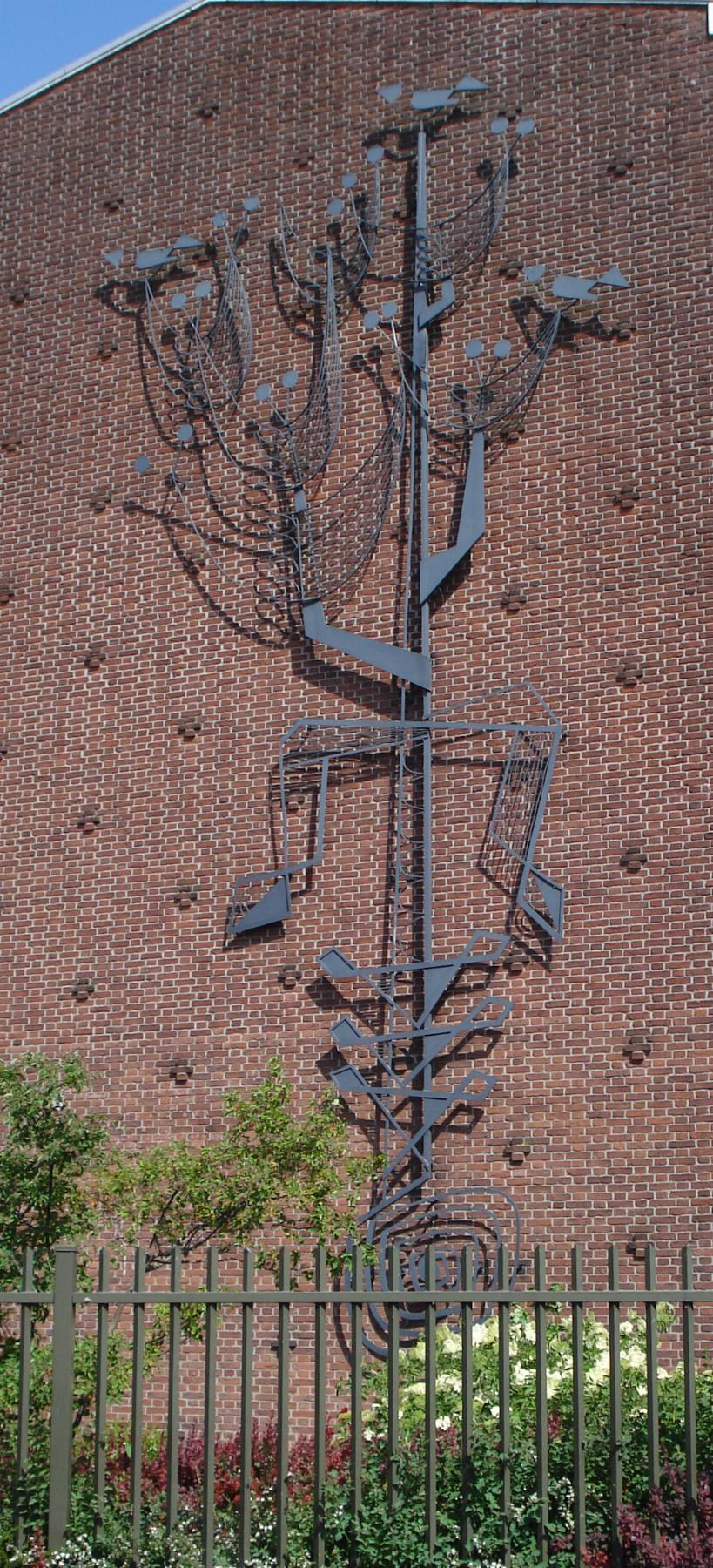
Het mosterdzaadje in Dordrecht
