= Giny Vos =

Dutch sculptor

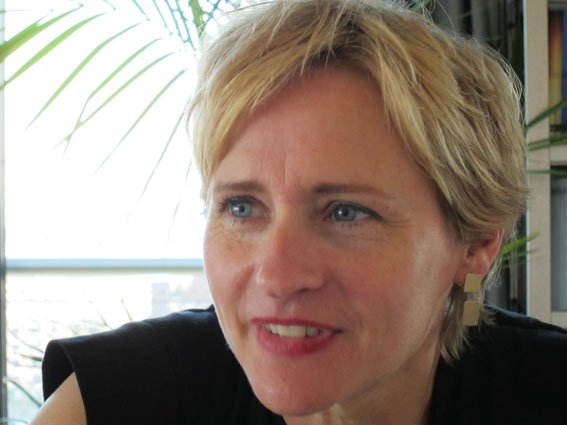
- Born: Regina Engelina Maria Vos; 30 October 1959 (age 66); Rotterdam, Netherlands
- Style: Light art, Installation art
- Website: ginyvos.nl

Regina Engelina Maria (Giny) Vos (born 30 October 1959) is a Dutch visual and conceptual artist. She makes monumental works of art for public spaces.

== Life ==
Vos graduated from the Gerrit Rietveld Academy in Amsterdam in 1988 and studied sculpture at the Rijksakademie van Beeldende Kunsten from 1988 to 1990. In one of the earliest presentations of Dutch video art, Vos was represented in a 1990 exhibition entitled "Imago, fin de siècle" alongside artists Jeffrey Shaw, Lydia Schouten, Boris Gerrets, and Madelon Hooykaas among others. In 2004, she received the Witteveen+Bos Prize for Art+Technology for her oeuvre.

== Selected works ==
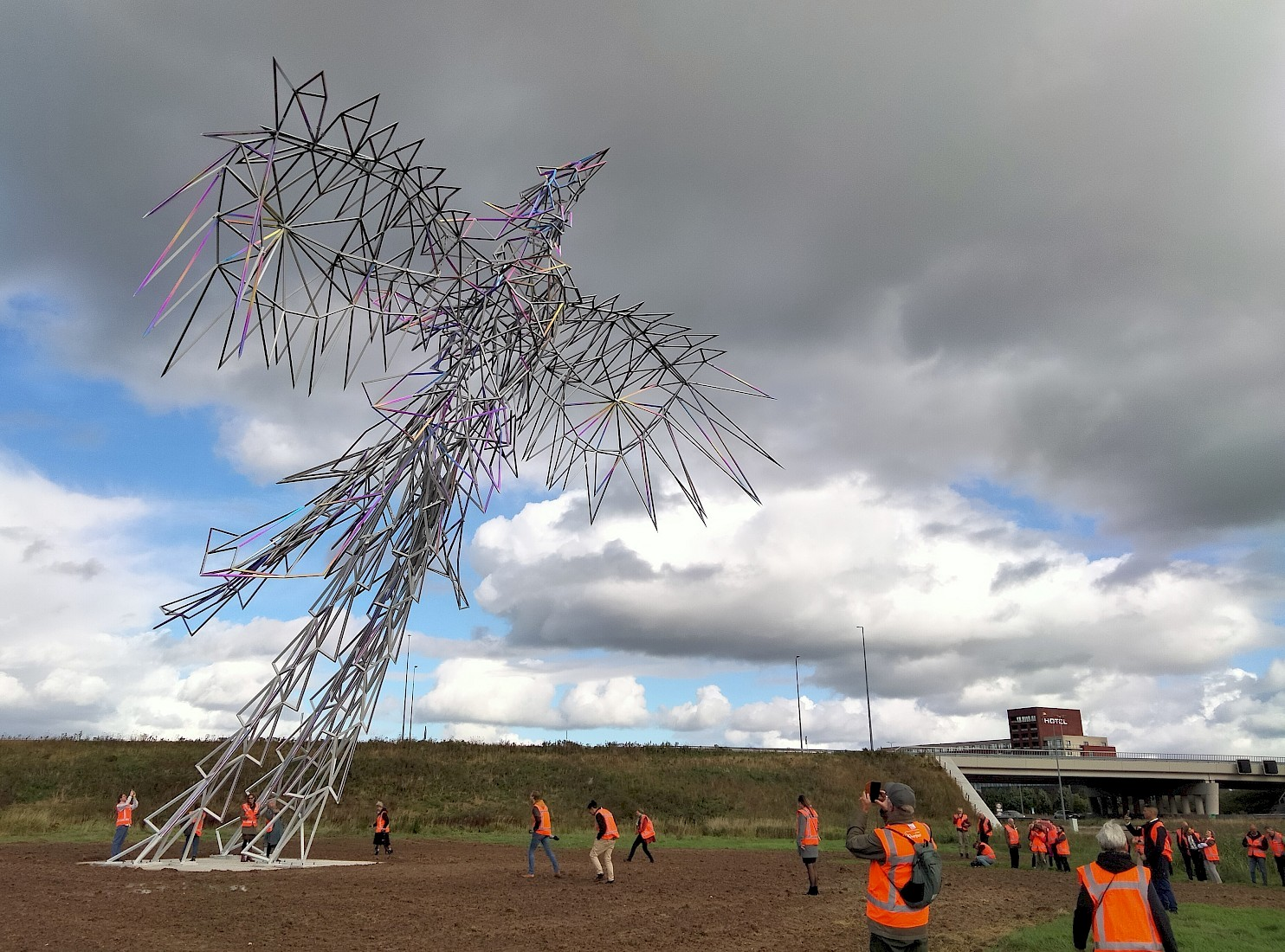
"Feniks," Poort van het Vechtdal, Zwolle, 2024.

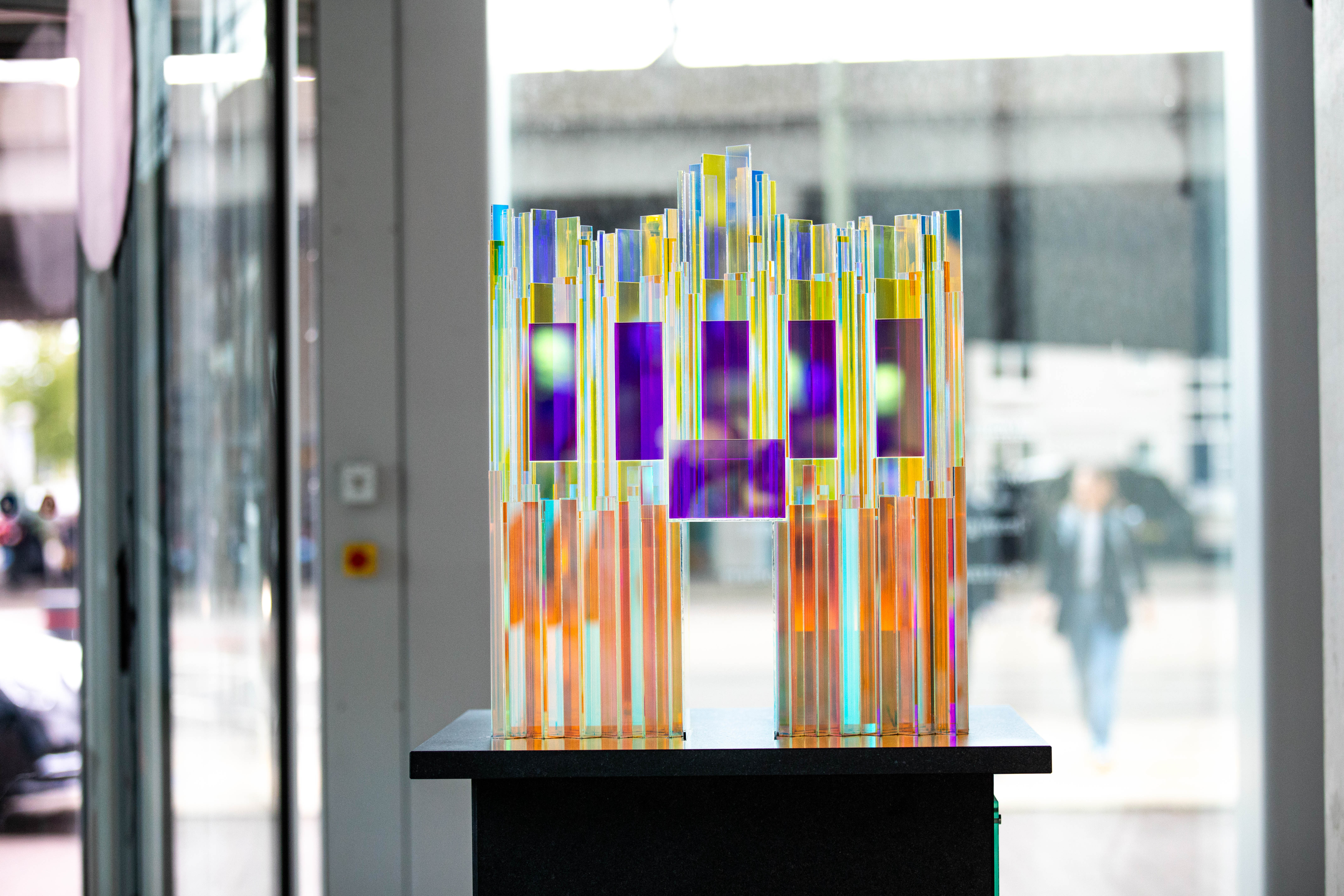
"Portal to Safety," Ministry of Foreign Affairs, The Hague, 2024.

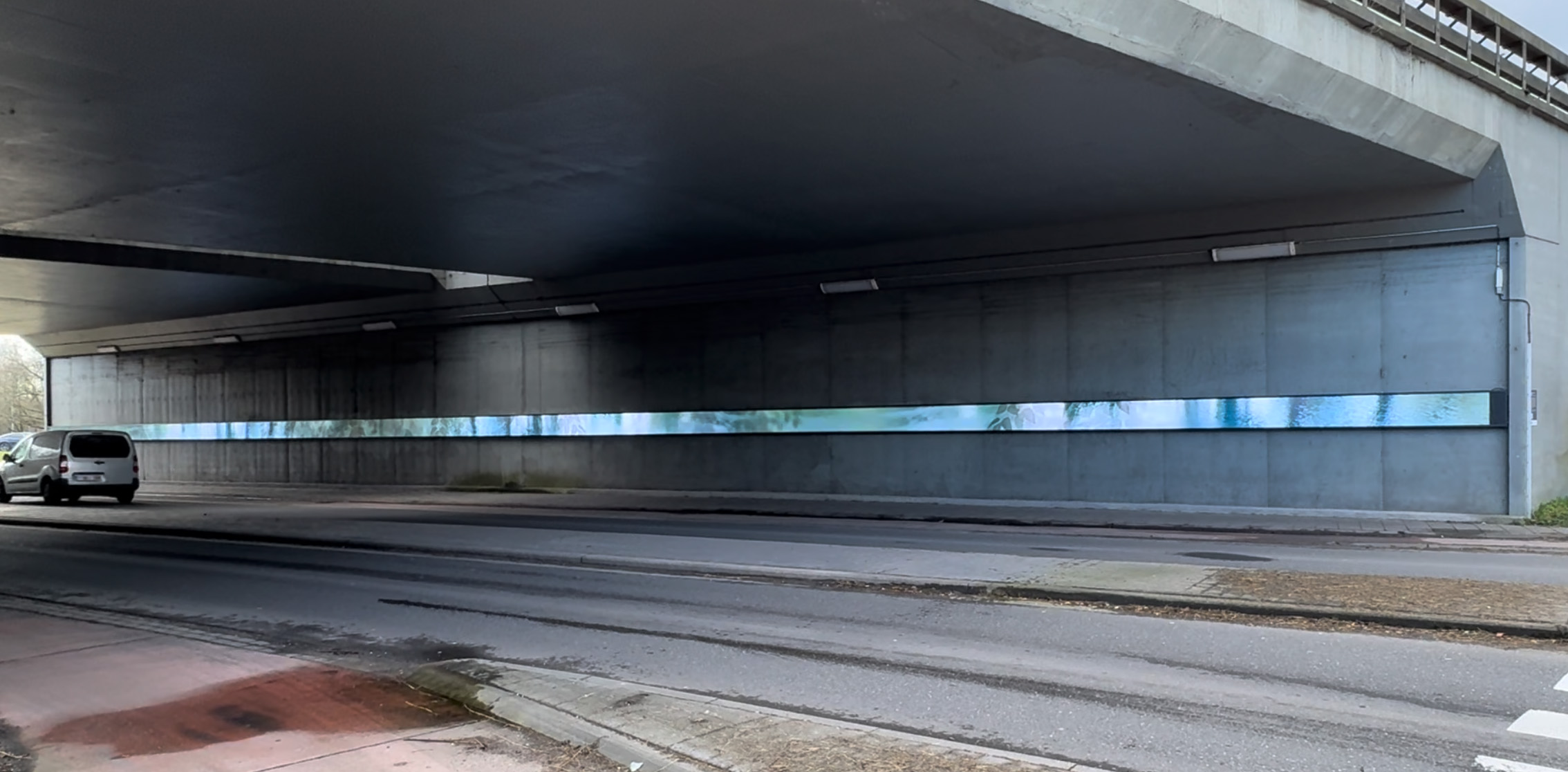
"Endless Horizon," Genk, Belgium, 2024.

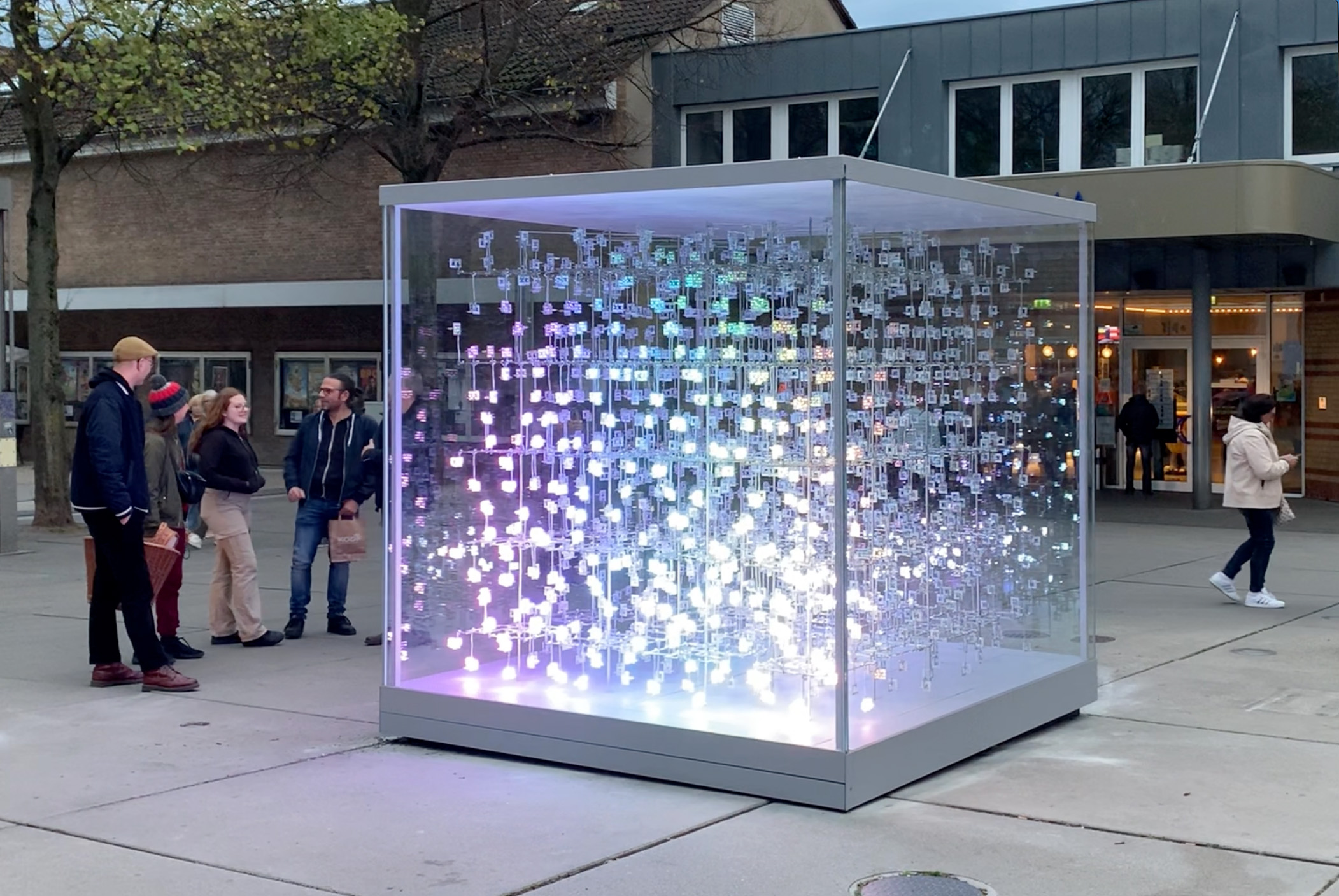
"Light Phenomena," Unna, Germany, 2022.

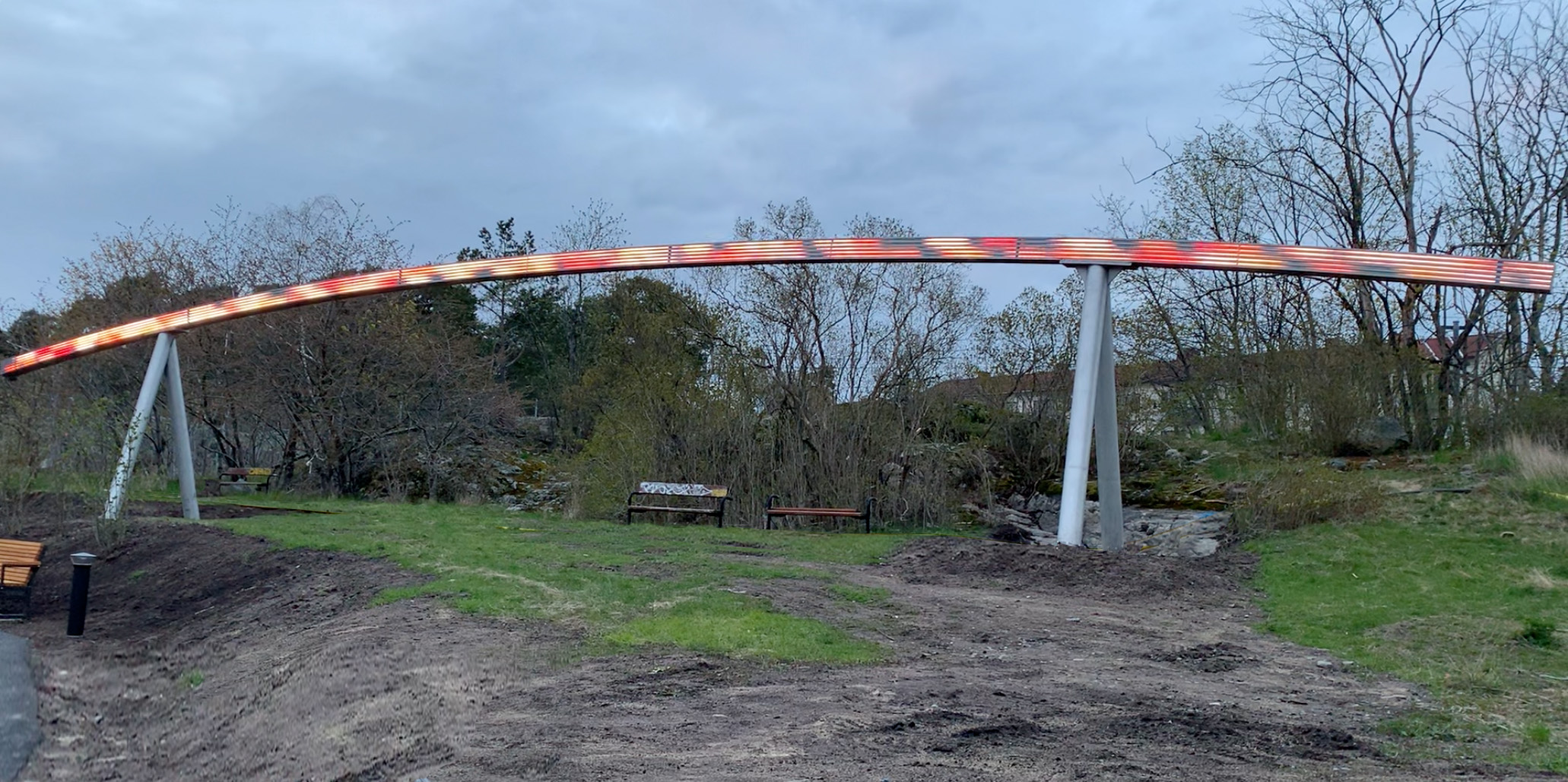
"Songlines of Daily Life," Stockholm, Sweden, 2021.

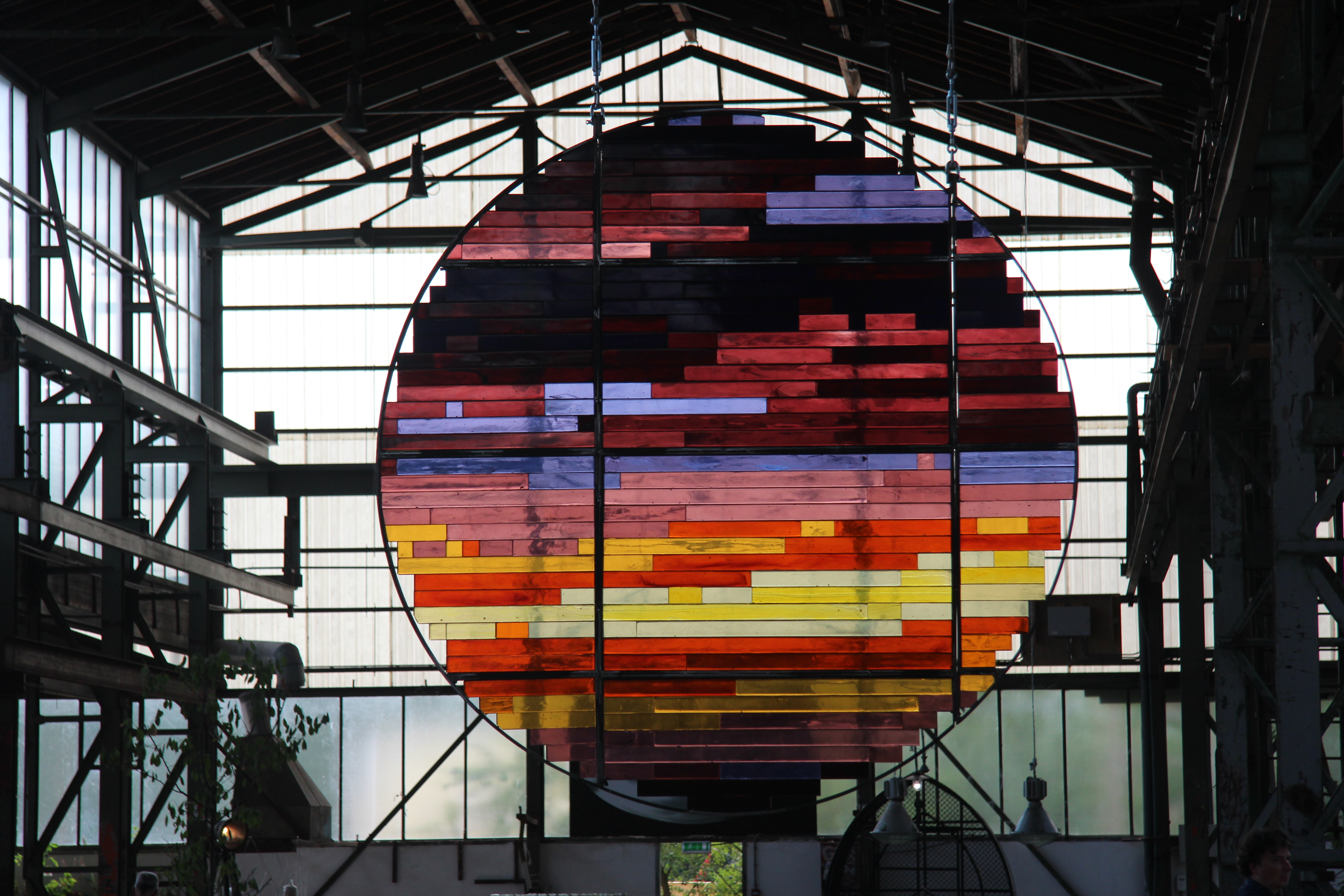
"Sjamaan," DordtYart, Dordrecht, 2016.

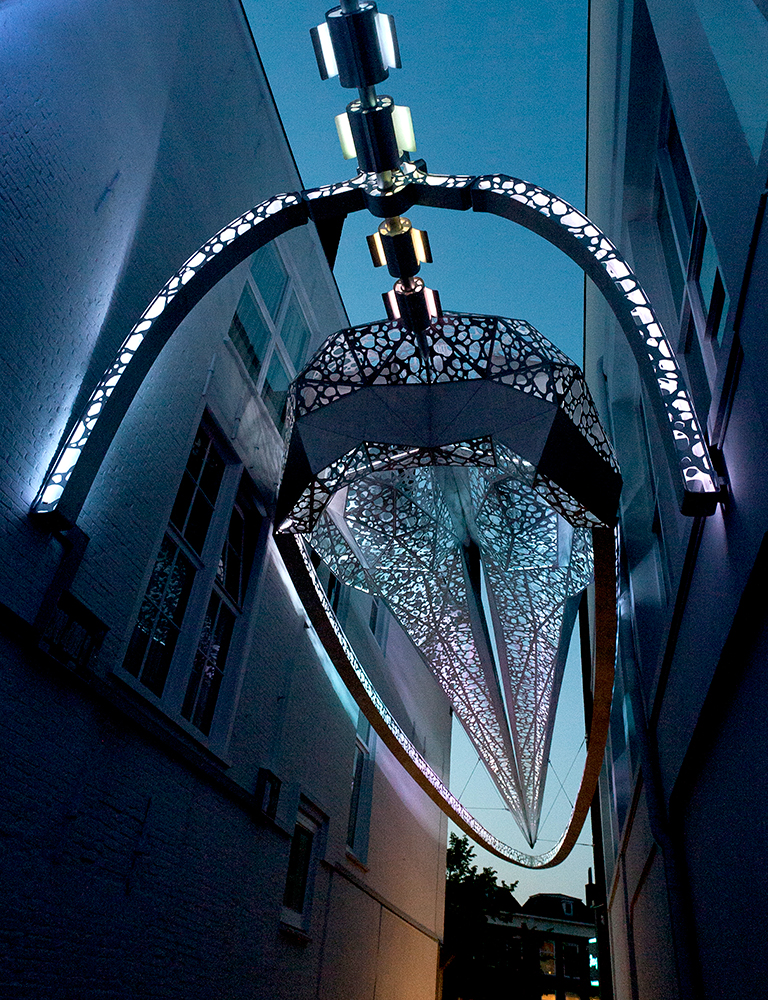
"Passage de la Baleine," Oude Lombardsteeg, Leeuwarden, 2015.

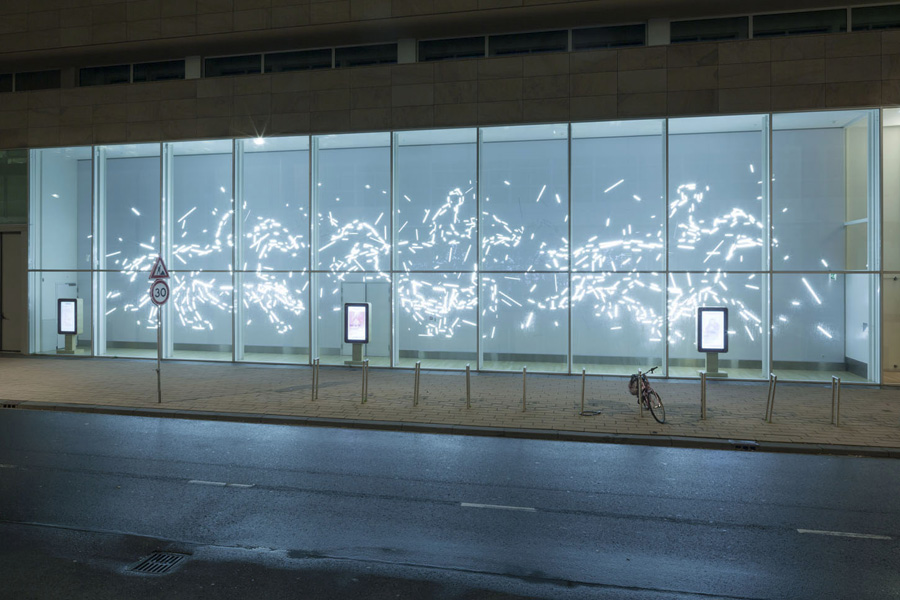
“Light Gig,“ Lantaren Venster Theater, Rotterdam, 2013.

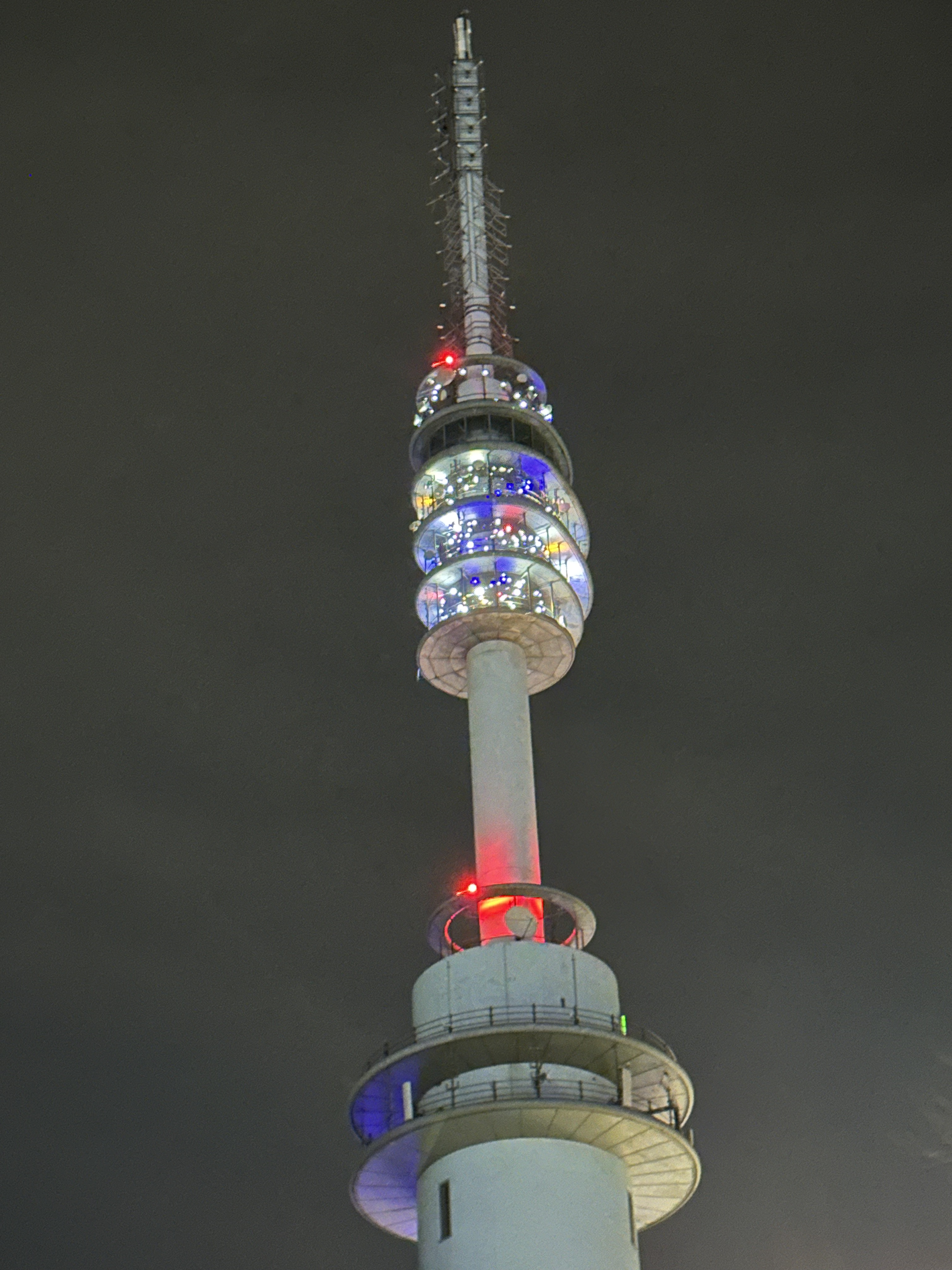
"White Noise," Zuidas, Amsterdam, 2009.

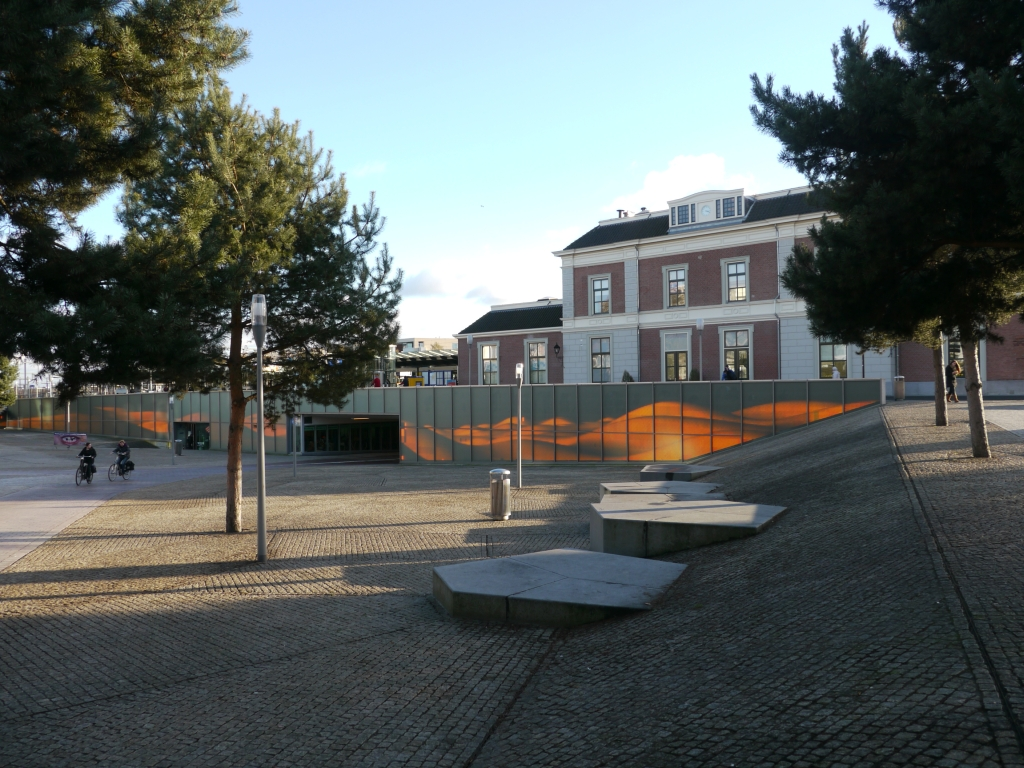
"Reizend Zand," Apeldoorn, 2008

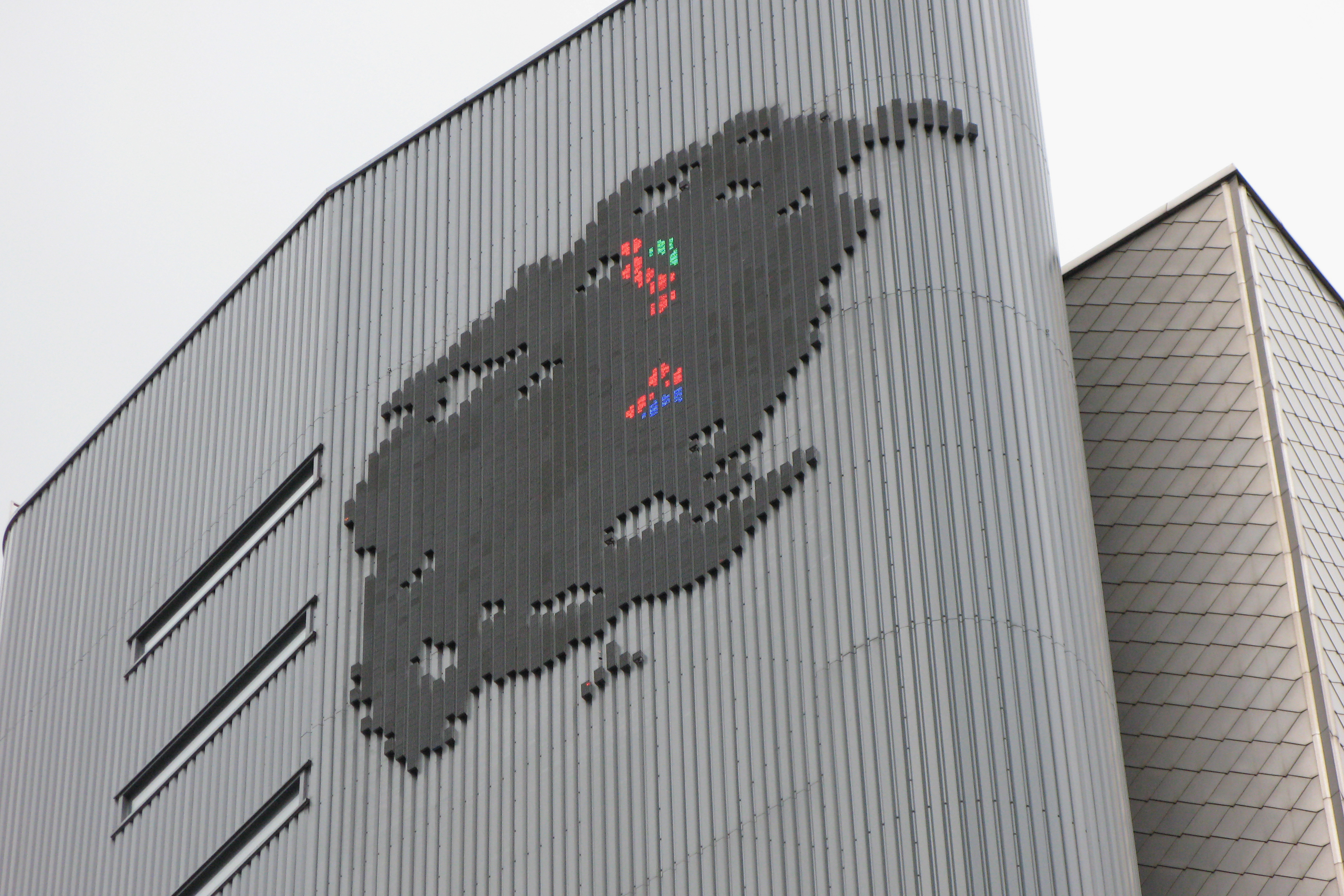
"Lust for Life," Naturalis Natural History Museum, Leiden, 1999.

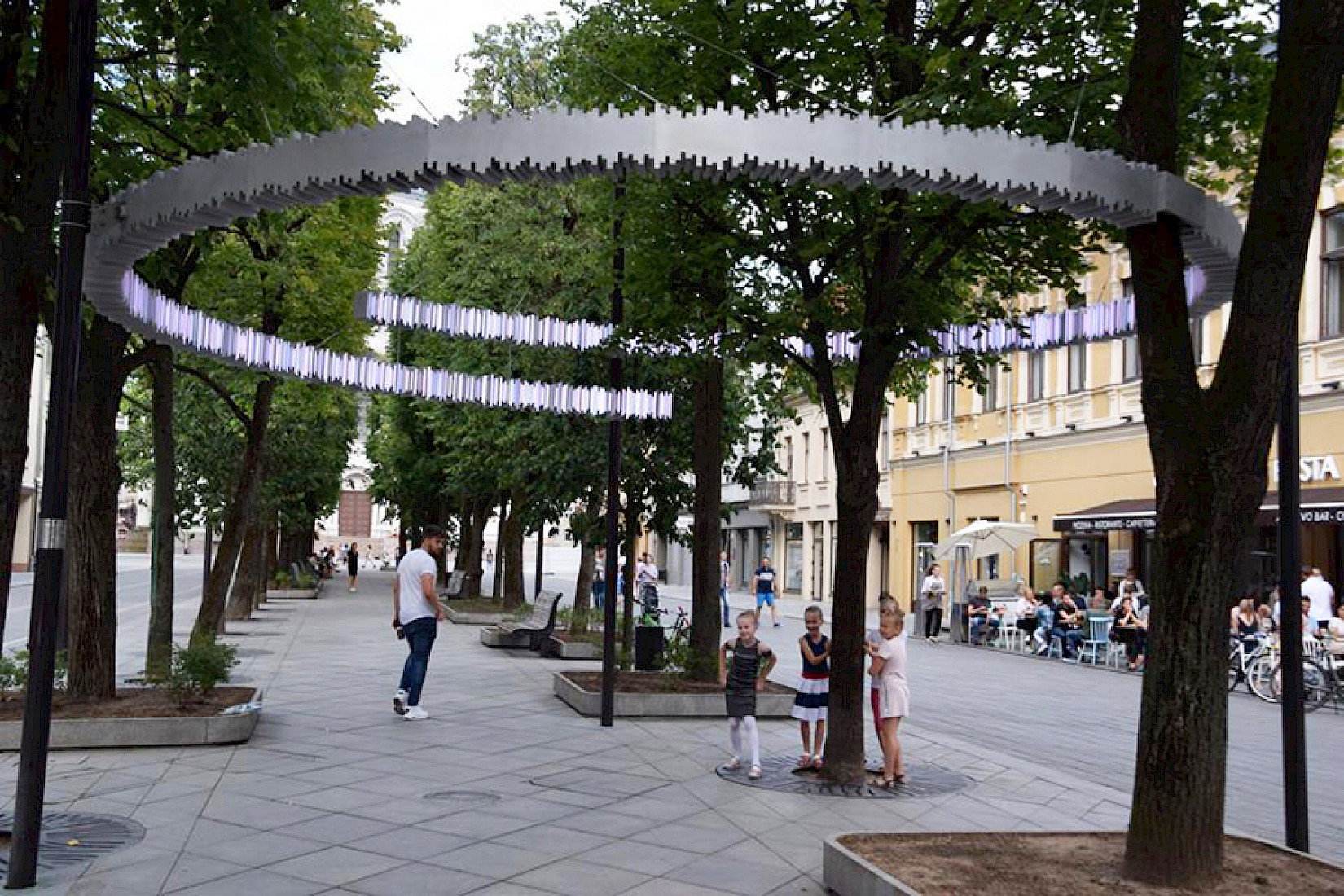
"Monument for Jan Zwartendijk," Kaunas, Lithuania, 2018.
