= Fons Bemelmans =

Dutch artist (born 1938)

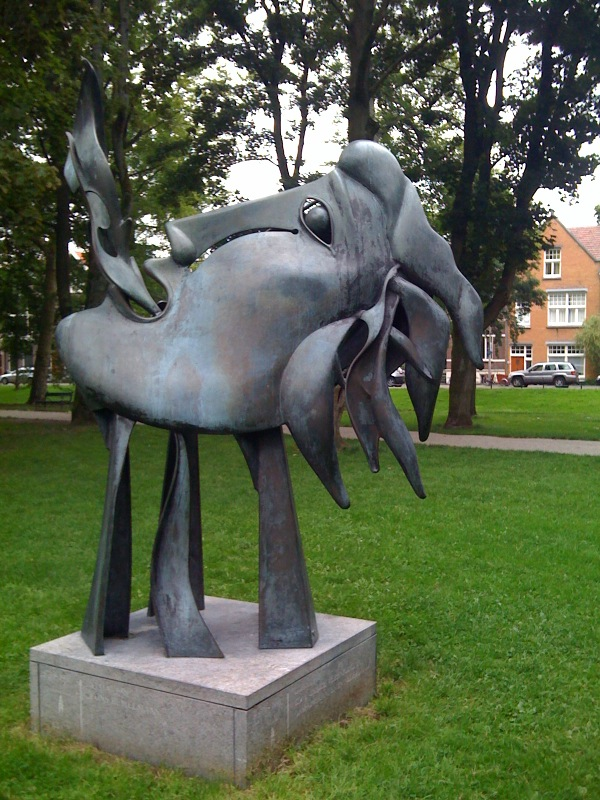
Gaia (1998) in Utrecht.

Alphons William Bernhard Johannes (Fons) Bemelmans (born 8 January 1938, in Maastricht) is a Dutch artist, best known as sculptor. He also works as goldsmith, painter, graphic artist and medal artist.

Bemelmans began his training as goldsmith in 1955 at the Stadsacademie voor Toegepaste Kunsten in Maastricht, where in 1958 he St. Luke Price won. From 1960 to 1962 he went to study with Professor Ludwig Gies in Cologne at the Kölner Werkschulen and afterwards with the Italian sculptor Luciano Minguzzi at the Accademia di Belle Arti di Brera in Milan until 1963. His work can be described as abstracted figurative with the classic theme of myths and legends caught in dreamy yet powerful shapes. Fons Bemelmans lives and works in Eijsden. He signs his work sometimes with AB.

In the 1980s he was also working as Professor at the School of Fine Arts, Amsterdam. His work has been bought by the British Museum. In 1999 Fons Bemelmans was appointed Officer of the Order of Orange-Nassau.
