= Maria Lalou =

Greek artist

- Μαρία Λάλου
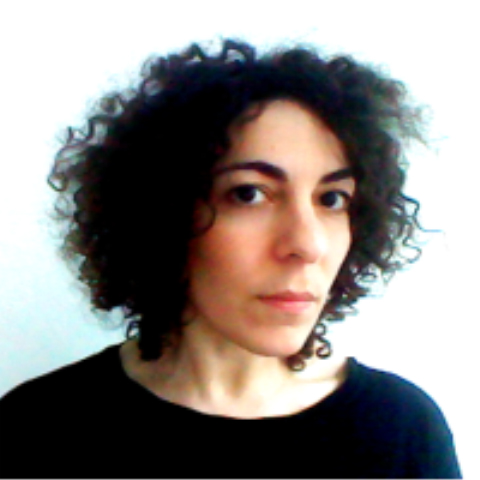
- Born: 1977 (age 48–49); Athens
- Education: Visual Arts, Interior Architecture & Design
- Alma mater: Gerrit Rietveld Academie
- Website: http://reaction-lalou.com

Maria Lalou (born in 1977) is a Greek contemporary conceptual artist, experimental filmmaker, architectural researcher, critical thinker and scholar. She explores the topic of viewing, incorporating cinematic apparatus and surveillance as part of her tools, with central references to the politics of the viewer. Her works negotiate about the notion of 'viewing' as a civic negotiation, by the means of a performative act, an active presence, an empirical duration, a filmic artefact and a political statement. Her artworks are on the edge of social experiments and practised rhetorics by staging art installations on the steps of theory of the spectacle. She includes the viewer's perspective in the completion of the works' significance, dividing her audiences into a specific audience as the chosen viewers participating in her works and a casual audience as the invited public to experience the works, results she has directed with the contribution of significant others. On the strong conceptual tracks that Stephen Willats has marked, her artistic practise is based on cognitive models in the spectrum installation art, performance art, art film and art publications, negotiating with rules of institutions.

From her beginning in the arts, she composed performance installations within the content of pseudo-scientific environments. A significant tool in her work is that particular identity of the white coat. Lalou's use of the audiences' perception makes her works critical of cultural norms, while experimenting with the boundaries of speculative theory and art making as a whole. Her research on the topic of view includes her article written for Roehampton University's peer-reviewed magazine and her first artist's book publication [θέατρο] in 2015. At the core of her investigations into the camera apparatus and its subjective role in society, her second book and art manifesto the camera was published at the end of 2019. In parallel, since 2012 she has had an ongoing collaboration with Danish architect Skafte Aymo-Boot – archival research into the un-finished concrete volumes of polykatoikia in Athens. The work deals with the concrete skeletons of Athens and engages the viewer in a process of looking into social, political and personal parts of the city's history. Lalou and Aymo-Boot's book Atlas of Athens' Incomplete Buildings – A Story of Hidden Antimonuments was published in autumn 2022 by Jap Sam Books in the Netherlands. Since early 2004 Lalou has split her time between Athens and Amsterdam.

== Work ==
Lalou's work is based on her ongoing research on the 'mechanisms of the seen' that started as an attempt to deconstruct 'the political' of the viewer. The research is focused on the role of the camera apparatus: its significance in the commons, its personification in the private, its appropriation in the surveillance of everyday networked reality and its potentiality as a weapon of truth in recording history. Lalou's works formulate a precise frame, often a distilled, almost lab-like setting, integrating the performative act of viewing into the production of each work and treating it as a major signifier. Her presence within her works manifests as an operator of the 'mechanisms of the seen'. Through cross-disciplinary methodology, Lalou often constructs large-scale staged settings where independent professionals are under their own personal identity and social role, aware that the material collected and the camera registration will be part of her ongoing archive on observations in the politics of viewing.

Through these principles in 2015 and with herself on stage under the role of the operator, she structured her first feature film filmed with the various types of cameras handled all by her invited guests. The result is a 144-minute silent movie titled OPERATED, produced in Amsterdam. She curated and directed the performative experiment OPERATED with the actual performance and contribution of Michaela Lakova, Geirthrudur Hjorvar, Paula Albuquerque, Barbara Phillip, Rune Peitersen, Alex Zakkas, Esma Moukhtar, Katja Sokolova, Eva Shippers and Celine Wouters. It opened to the public as an exhibition, "The Operational Model", including a film, OPERATED. In 2018 she recorded her first feature film, The Dialogue, during her 8-month period in New York, along with Knut Åsdam, Andrew Fremont-Smith, Jennifer Uleman and Andreas Wimmer.

== Biography ==
Lalou is an artist and thinker born in Athens, Greece, and a Fulbright scholar. She is educated in interior architecture and design from the Technological Educational Institute of Athens and in fine arts from the Gerrit Rietveld Academie in Amsterdam. She was granted a research period in Copenhagen in the Royal Danish Academy of Fine Arts (formerly Denmarks Designskole) and intense research into theatre followed at the DasArts in Amsterdam. She has been a lecturer in fine arts and architecture of Princeton University, Princeton; architecture of ETH, Zurich; Aalto University of Helsinki, Finland; Rijksacademie Studios, Amsterdam; Cittadellarte-Fondazione Pistoletto, Biella, Italy; and Università IUAV di Venezia, Venice, amongst others. She has contributed to the peer-reviewed journal activate, University of Roehampton, London, as well as Leonardo and MIT Press journals. Since 2012, along with her autonomous work, Lalou works with the Danish architect Skafte Aymo-Boot in the collective practise of contemporary archeology. In 2020, Lalou & Aymo-Boot co-founded Cross Section Archive, a space for art and architecture in Athens, investigating phenomena occurring at the intersection of the disciplines, and exploring how historical facts, political structures and everyday circumstances have interfered, co-produced and directed them.

== Selected exhibitions ==
Lalou's works have been presented internationally at Printed Matter, Inc, New York; LIMA, Amsterdam; Onomatopee, Eindhoven; Galeria Rondo Sztuki, Katowice, Poland; Contemporary Art Museum of Thessaloniki, Greece; and Motto, Berlin, Germany, amongst others.
