= Hansje van Halem =

Dutch graphic designer and type designer (born 1978)

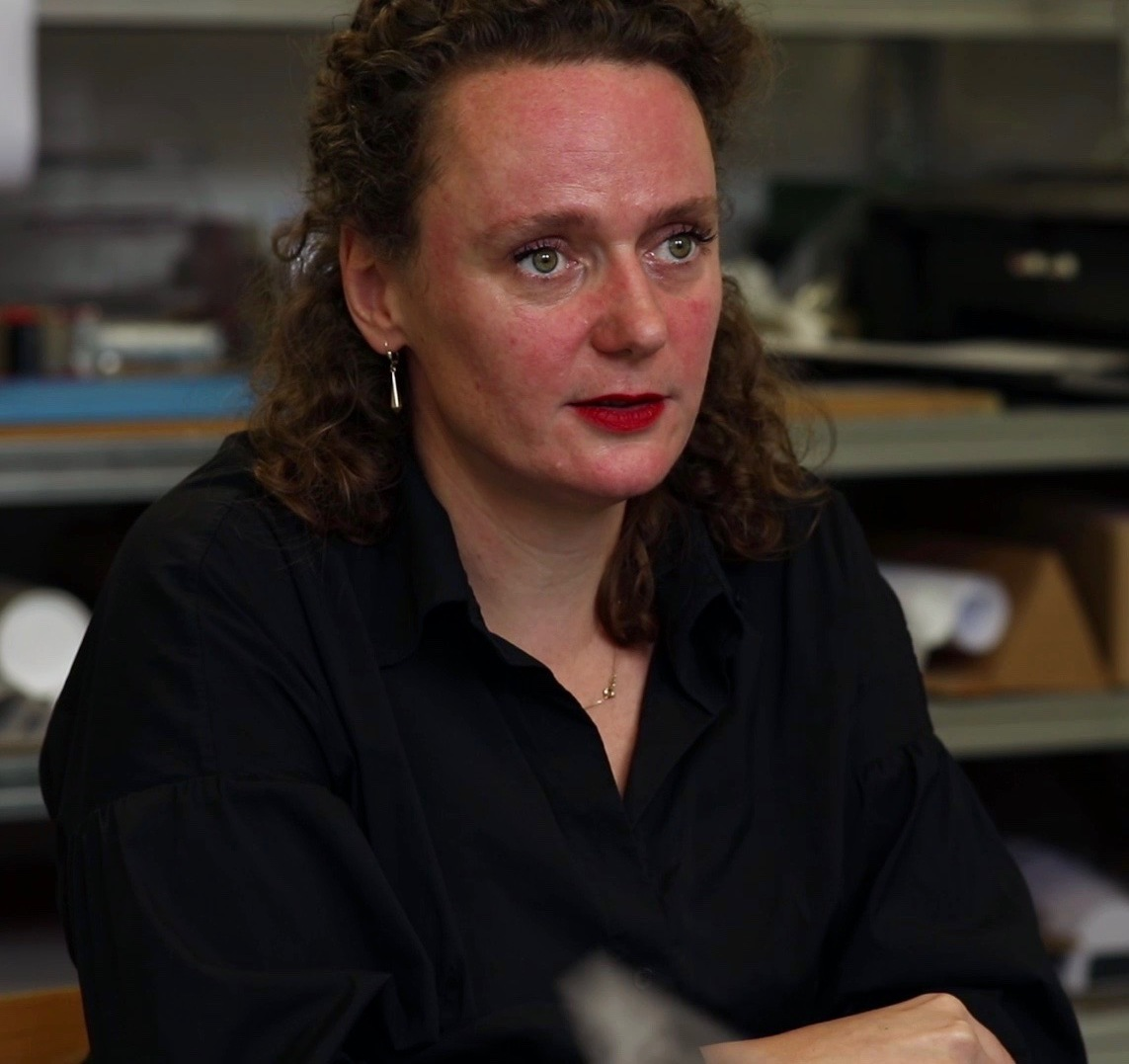
- Born: 1978 (age 47–48); Enschede, Netherlands
- Occupations: graphic designer, type designer
- Years active: 2003-present

Interview with Hansje van Halem.

Hansje van Halem (born 1978) is a Dutch graphic designer and type designer. Her work is typified by geometric, repetitive, sometimes almost psychedelic patterns. She works at the intersection of text, illustration, pattern, colour, texture, distortions, interruptions, variations, symmetry, systematic approach and irregularities. Van Halem combines the more open rules of patterns with the tighter ruleset of typography and explores the boundaries of type design. She uses the viewer’s distance to the work to move at the edge of legibility and non-legibility. In her understanding background and type should become one layer. Important to her are the process itself, “playing” around and working with trial and error. Her commissions rather revolve around the creation of identities, whole covers and patterns than individual fonts.

Hansje van Halem studied graphic and typographic design at the Royal Academy of Art in The Hague from 1998 to 2000. In 2003 she subsequently graduated in Graphic Design from the Rietveld Academy. Since 2003 she has her own studio in Amsterdam. She also gives lectures, workshops, teaches and exhibits since 2003.

Van Halem's designs have been exhibited in many museums, mainly in the Netherlands and the United States. In 2017, a solo exhibition of her work took place at the Bijzondere Collecties van de Universiteit van Amsterdam. Works by Hansje van Halem are included in the collection of the Stedelijk Museum Amsterdam.

Since 2017, she has been the head designer of the Lowlands festival, for which she works with programmers and animators. In 2018, she received a Dutch Design Award for her Lowlands designs.

== Typeface ==
- WIND (2016, a Layered Typeface for Optical Illusions)

== Notable works ==
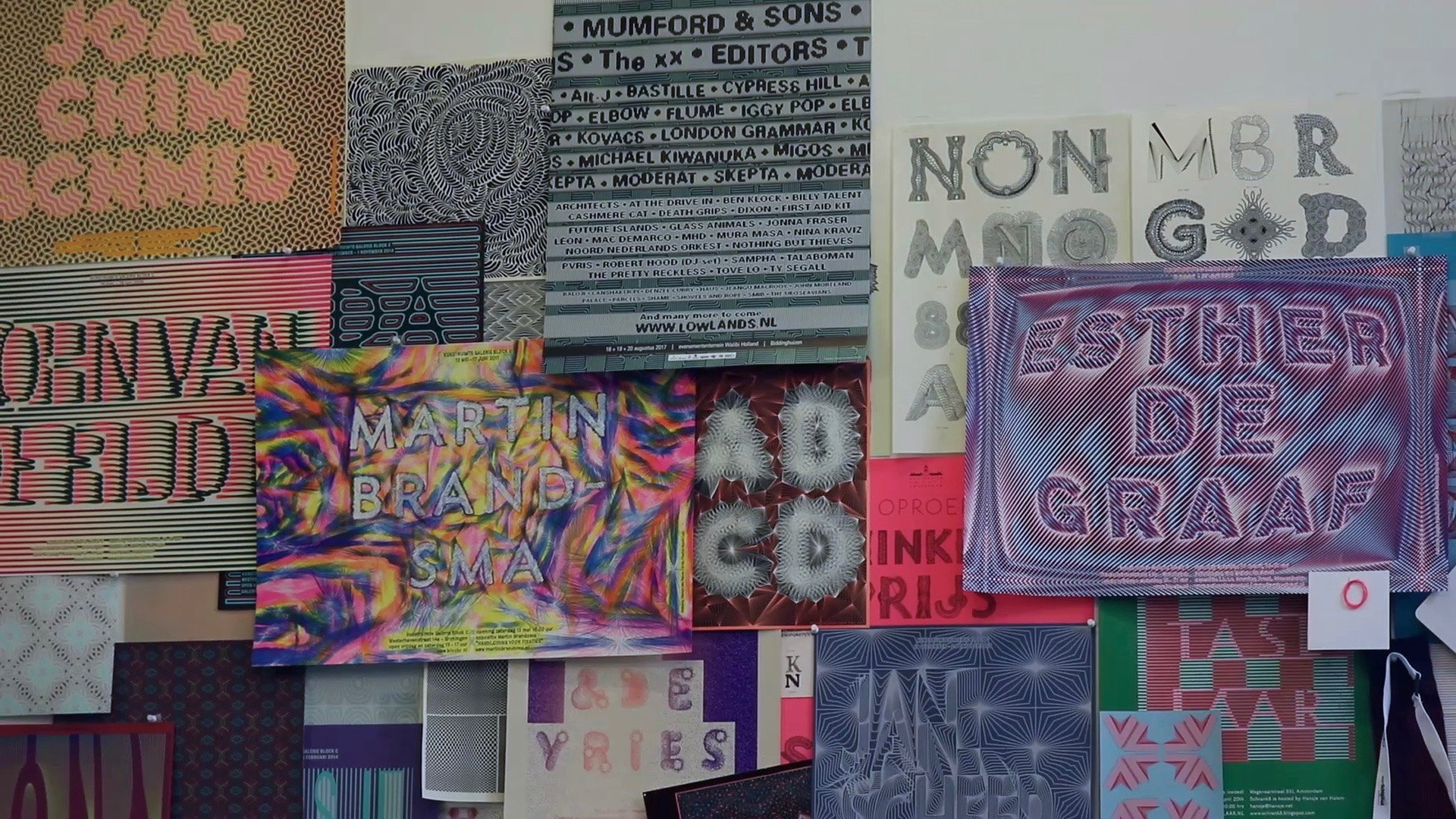
A selection of graphic designs by Hansje van Halem.

- Lowlands (2017 and ongoing, visual identity for music festival)
- Text monument K. Michel Tugelaweg - Design for a 350 meter long text monument remembering the old Jewish area as it was before WWII. Poem written for this occasion by K. Michel (2017)
- SmartGate - fence for Schiphol Airport (2016)
- Walking on Water - floor design for Roman-Catholic church St. Bonifatius on Oostzijde in Zaandam, NL (2015)
- Postage Stamps - TNT Post (2007)

== Prizes / Nominations ==
- 2019, Best Dutch Book Design (De Best Verzorgde Boeken) — Winner for Theory of Type Design (Gerard Unger).
- 2018, Dutch Design Awards — Winner in the Communication category for Lowlands 2018 house style (in collaboration with Marjolein Rinckes, Jurriaan Hos, and Just van Rossum).
- 2011, Dutch Design Awards — Finalist in the Graphic Design category.
- 2010, Best Photography Books of the Year (PhotoEspaña) — Selection for Phantom City by Kim Bouvy.
- 2008, Most Beautiful Books 2007 (De Best Verzorgde Boeken) — Selection for CO-OPs / Interterritoriale explorations in art and science.
- 2005, Schönste Bücher aus aller Welt (Leipzig) — Honorable Mention for Adviezen ter Voorбереiding van het Amsterdams Kunstenplan 2004 - 2008.
- 2005, Most Beautiful Books 2004 (De Best Verzorgde Boeken) — Selection for Adviezen ter Voorbereiding van het Amsterdams Kunstenplan 2004 - 2008.
- 2005, Most Beautiful Books 2004 (De Best Verzorgde Boeken) — Selection for Mark, Municipal Art Acquisitions 2003 - 2004.
- 2003, Most Beautiful Annual Reports 2002 — Selection for VPRO Annual Report 2002.
