= Percy Irausquin =

- Born: Joseph Gregory Percy Irausquin; 26 June 1969; Oranjestad, Aruba
- Died: 14 August 2008 (aged 39); Amsterdam, Netherlands
- Occupation: Fashion designer

Joseph Gregory Percy Irausquin (26 June 1969 – 14 August 2008) was an Aruban-born Dutch fashion designer and couturier based in Amsterdam. He was described by the Dutch media as "one of the most talented young designers in the Netherlands." The Dutch national daily newspaper De Volkskrant described his clothing designs as "sexy and extravagant" and "fashionable but not fussy."

Irausquin was born in Oranjestad, Aruba, on 26 June 1969. He graduated from the Gerrit Rietveld Academie, an art and design school in Amsterdam. His work was noticed by Christian Lacroix, a high end French fashion designer. Irausquin went to work for Lacroix in Paris shortly after his graduation. He later worked for Givenchy with Hubert Barrere, a corset specialist, and at the house of Christian Dior.

Irausquin was named by Vogue Magazine as a prominent up-and-coming designer in 2007. His work was featured on the covers of several Dutch and international magazines, including Marie Claire and Elle. He held a fashion show at the Amsterdam Fashion Week 2008 just a few days before his death. He was once quoted in an interview as saying of his work, "I'm not one for complicated ideas. I'm not an innovator. I don't want to change the world. I just want to make it more beautiful."

Irausquin was found dead at his home in Amsterdam on 14 August 2008, after suffering a cerebral hemorrhage. He was buried in his native Aruba.
