= Eric Deis =

Canadian photographer

Eric Deis (born 1979) is a Canadian photographer best known for his large-scale photographs. In particular, his work addresses the "narrative potential of an all-encompassing picture plane".

== Life ==
Born in Queen Charlotte Islands, British Columbia, Eric Deis received a BFA from Emily Carr Institute of Art and Design in 1999, and an MFA from the University of California, San Diego in 2004. Deis currently lives and works in Vancouver, B.C.

== Projects ==
In 2006, his photographs of sunset over Burrard Bridge were exhibited at Vancouver's Western Front gallery. During the 2010 Winter Olympics in Vancouver, Deis unveiled a 43' x 32' photograph, "Last Chance", on the side of the Canadian Broadcasting Corporation building in downtown Vancouver. In 2011, Deis collaborated with artist Sonny Assu on the project Artifacts of Authenticity. In 2013, Deis encouraged the public to pirate his 360 degree image of Vancouver, titled Skybridge, that he took from the Skytrain bridge that traverses Vancouver's Fraser River.

== Awards ==
In 2007, Deis won the VADA (Visual Art Development Award) from the Vancouver Foundation.

== Collections ==
Deis' work is in the permanent collections of the Vancouver Art Gallery and Video Out in Vancouver.
