= Hans Bouman =

Dutch visual artist

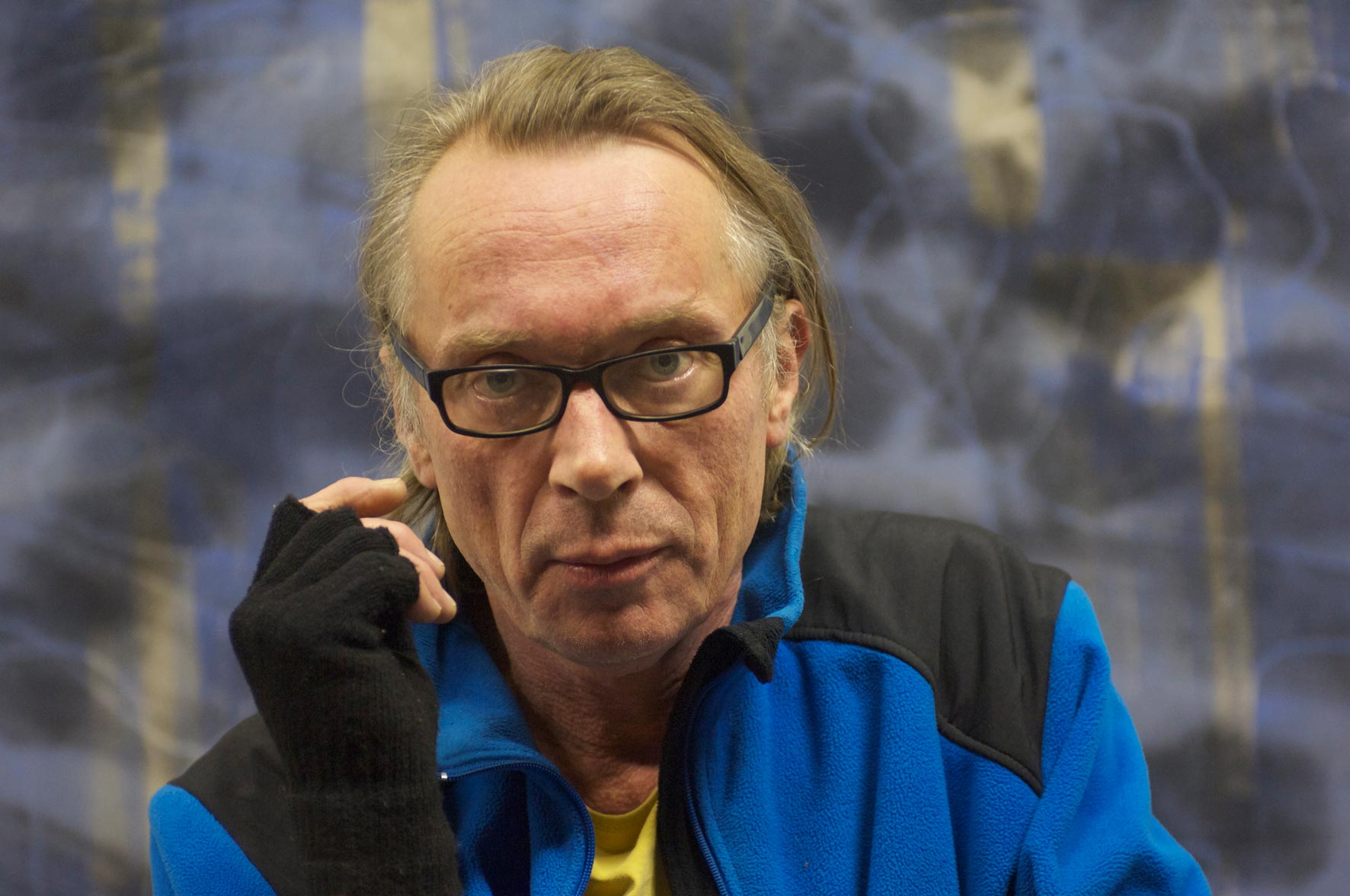
- Hans Bouman in his studio
- Born: 21 July 1951; Haarlem, Netherlands
- Education: Rietveld Academie, Amsterdam
- Known for: Painting, Sculpture
- Website: www.hansbouman.com

Hans Bouman (born in 1951) is a Dutch visual artist working in painting, sculpture, etching and video. He settled in Paris in 1980.

== Life and career ==
Hans Bouman grew up in Haarlem, Netherlands, and earned his degrees at the Graphics School and at the Rietveld Academy of Amsterdam in 1978.

After settling in Paris in 1980, he received the Painting Prize at the Salon de Montrouge in 1985. He subsequently established himself as a visual artist.

During his career, Bouman's works have grown in a series of interconnected cycles. His hieratic heads carved in the thickness and density of the layers of paint recalled the Moai of Easter Island, the African masks or the dramatic elongations of Expressionnism. « The magic of Bouman lies in the play on pictorial matter and his capacity to make a forceful figure emerge from it, both literally and figuratively" Henri-François Debailleux wrote at the time. In a subsequent series, a whole pantheon of gods and goddesses was born from his imagination: Årantaleph, Olafdir, Kratikoff, Mandi Tan...

Along the years, art critics Alin Avila, Gérard Barrière, Gérard-Georges Lemaire, as well as novelist Daniel Picouly wrote the prefaces to the catalogues of his one-man shows. He has always used photography, for instance in a series dedicated to the bunkers stranded on the beaches of the North Sea. With the development of digital photography, he merged drawing, painting and etching with the many possibilities offered by new technologies.

Travelling has always been part and parcel of his artistic approach. During his stays in Bobo-Dioulasso in Burkina Faso and Foumban in Cameroon, together with local traditional bronze casters he created a series of bronze lost-wax sculptures.

In 2014, he created a monumental sculpture for the Par't Sino-français in Shunde near Canton, Guangdong, that marked the anniversary of the 50 years of diplomatic relationships between France and China.

When he was invited as an artist in residence by the ADEFC created by novelist Ya Ding in 2017 et 2018, Hans Bouman's work took on a new direction, inspired by the astounding landscapes of Guangxi and Hubei provinces.

Hans Bouman is also the author of experimental films (The meanders of black, A Dream based on Franz Kafka's short story) and video portraits of his artist friends: Painters in Longzhou, Christine Jean, Serge Plagnol, Fred Kleinberg, Zwy Milshtein, Bernard Ollier, Sophie Sainrapt, Albert Hirsch...

Hans Bouman also works in his new studio in the countryside in the Loiret, where his recent work is permeated by the natural elements that surround him.

== Selected 0ne-man shows ==
- 2024 Chemins de traverse, H20, Differdange, Luxembourg
- 2023 Chemins de traverse, Galerie Area, Paris
- 2022 Corps & Esprit III, IF-Grenier à sel, Châtillon-Coligny
- 2022 Lignes de Mire, Galerie Area, Paris
- 2020 Nature du regard, IF-Grenier à sel, Châtillon-Coligny
- 2018 Je peins, donc tu es, Orangerie du Sénat, galerie Area, Paris
- 2015 Loin des images et du bruit, Galerie Univer / Colette Colla, Paris
- 2014 Le Concours des torses, Galerie Vanuxem, Paris
- 2012 Body and Soul II, Pink Gallery, Seoul, South Korea,
- 2012 Body and Soul I, Kunstdoc, Seoul, South Korea
- 2012 Corps et Esprit II, Espace Saint-Louis, Bar-le-Duc
- 2011 Têtes à tête, La Serre, Saint-Étienne
- 2010 En corps, La Réserve d'area, Paris
- 2008 Têtes ardentes, La Réserve d'area, Paris, catalogue
- 2008 Corps et esprit, Centre d'art contemporain Raymond Farbos, Mont-de-Marsan
- 2007 Suaire de soi, La Réserve d'area, Paris
- 2005 Labyrinthe, avec S. Galazzo, F. Haddad et S. Sainrapt, L'Entrepôt, Paris
- 2004 10 ans de peinture, Galerie Le Confort des Étranges, Toulouse
- 2001 Galerie Art Déco, Antananarivo
- 2000 Galerie Koralewski, Paris
- 1999 Galerie Simoncini, Luxembourg
- 1997 Au pays Lobi avec Bertrand Rieger, espace Paul Ricard, Paris,
- 1997 Centre culturel Albert Camus, Antananarivo, Madagascar
- 1996 Œuvres récentes, Studio Kostel, Paris, Œuvres sur papier, galerie Vanuxem, Paris, Parcours 1985/1996, galerie Kiron, Paris
- 1995 Galerie Westlund, Stockholm, Galerie Vanuxem, Paris
- 1993 Traits de caractère, Chapelle de l'hôtel de ville, Vesoul
- 1993 Galerie Nicole Buck, Strasbourg
- 1993 Galerie Vanuxem, Paris
- 1992 Galerie Simoncini, Luxembourg,
- 1992 Sculptures, galerie Koralewski, Paris
- 1990 Studio Kostel, Paris
- 1990 Galerie Vanuxem, Paris
- 1990 Galerie La Cour 21, Nantes
- 1987 Galleria M.R., Rome
- 1987 Galerie Nicole Ferry, Paris
- 1986 Galerie Flora, Espace Kiron, Paris
- 1985 Galerie Jean-Claude David, Grenoble

== Books ==
- 2023 Chemins de traverse, monography, Area publisher
- 2021 Family affairs #6, 3 paper works with M. Bouman & R. Ruseler
- 2020 Haarlem en ik, leporello, collection Museum Haarlem
- 2018 Le Corps derrière le corps, text by Gérard-Georges Lemaire, Piver publisher
- 2018 CommeUn n°17, text by Daniel Picouly with A. Inumaru et N. Gaulier, Area Paris, Alin Avila publisher
- 2016 CommeUn n° 7, text by Alain Pizerra with B. Guarrigues et B. Pingeot, Area Paris, Alin Avila publisher
- 2014 Le Concours des torses, text by Gérard-Georges Lemaire, Piver publisher
- 2013 Face-A-Face, a photographic dialogue in South Korea, Piver publisher
- 2012 Body & Soul, Paris & Seoul, Piver publisher
- 2005 Sextus, text by Gérard-Georges Lemaire, Area Paris publisher
- 1998 From Bobo to Ouaga, text by Hans Bouman & Tony Soulié, Yeo publisher for Area Paris
- 1998 Family Affairs, with M. Bouman & R. Ruseler, text by I. Lanz & D. Cunin, M.Bouman publisher (ISBN 9080360821)
- 1997 Chemins croisés en Pays Lobi, texts by G. Barrière, C. Barbier, H. Bouman, M.-C. Guyot, F. Le Graverend & B. Rieger, Espace Paul Ricard & Polaroid
- 1996 Voici moi, poem by Tadeusz Koralewski, illustrated by Hans Bouman, Area Paris, Alin Avila publisher
- 1993 Têtes, a drawing notebook, Yeo for Area Paris, Alin Avila publisher
- 1993 Visages, text by Gérard Barrière, galerie Vanuxem publisher, Paris

== Collections ==
- Ville de Differdange, Luxembourg
- Guangzhou FengLe Medical Technology Co, Guangzhou, Guangdong, Chine
- Museum Haarlem, Haarlem, Pays-Bas
- International Art Centre, Shangjin, Hubei, Chine
- International Museum, Longzhou, Guangxi, Chine
- P’art sino-français, Shunde, Guangdong, Chine
- BNP Paribas, Paris
- Ars Aevi, Museum of Contemporary Art, Sarajevo, Bosnia and Herzegovina
- Musée de Toulon, donation Alin Avila

== Selected articles ==
- Michel Schroeder, Une inconditionnelle passion pour l'art, Zeitung vum Lëzebuerger Vollek, 27 juin 2024
- Christian Noorbergen, « Chemins de traverse », Aralya, november 2023
- Monique de Beaucorps, « À Hans Bouman », in Mon musée imaginaire, december 2024
- Ronald Ruseler, « Néerlandais en France, Français dans son art »
- Gérard-Georges Lemaire, « Hans Bouman, Chemins de traverse » Verso-hebdo, 2 novembre 2023https://archive.wikiwix.com/cache/index2.php?url=https%3A%2F%2Fwww.visuelimage.com%2Fhebdo%2Findex.php%3Fad%3D0%26id_news%3D9479#federation=archive.wikiwix.com&tab=url
- Alin Avila, « Chemins de traverse », 2023
- Gérard-Georges Lemaire, Dans l'atelier de Hans Bouman, Verso-hebdo, 2021
- Vitorio E. Pisu, Hans Bouman. Nature du regard, Palazzi a Venezia n° 9, septembre 2020
- Alin Avila, Je peins, donc tu es, area revue n° 34, printemps 2018
- Hassouna Mosbahi, Un peintre hollandais à Paris, elaph.com, 30 mars 2017
- Gérard-Georges Lemaire, Body and Soul, Culture Ocean, mars-avril 2013
- Chistophe Averty, Les âmes silencieuses, Artension n° 112, 2013
- Gérard Férou, L’Afrique fantôme d'Hans Bouman, Les Lettres françaises, octobre 2007
- Gérard-Georges Lemaire, Hans Bouman , Santé mentale, no 167, 2012
- Henri-François Debailleux, Hans Bouman en têtes, Libération, 29 novembre 1996
- Françoise Monnin, Le double visage d'Hans Bouman, Muséart, no 55, novembre 1995

== Bibliography ==
- Gérard-Georges Lemaire, Le Noir absolu et les Leçons de ténèbres, Hémisud, 2009
- Daniel Picouly et Gérard-Georges Lemaire, Têtes ardentes, Éditions Area, 2008
- Gérard-Georges Lemaire, Labyrinthe, 2004
- Alin Avila, Totems de silence: Hans Bouman, 1996, Yeo éditeur pour Area, Paris (EAN 265–0006469745)
- Gérard Barrière, Traits de caractères, 1993
- Henri-François Debailleux, Hans Bouman, Galerie Vanuxem éditeur, Paris, 1990
- Gérard Barrière, Hans le tenace, Paris, 1987
- Henri-François Debailleux et Gérard-Georges Lemaire, Hans Bouman, Grenoble, 1985
- Alin Avila, L'Éloge de la peinture,
