= Gerrit Rietveld Academie =

Art academy in Amsterdam, Netherlands

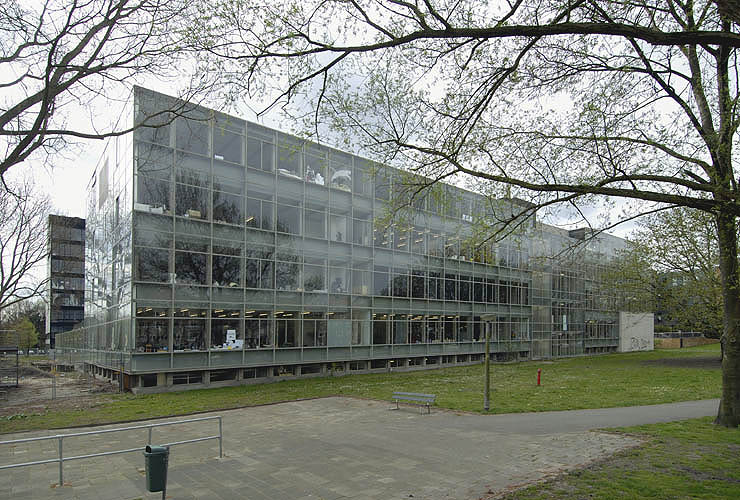
- Gerrit Rietveld Academie in 2007
- Former name: Instituut voor Kunstnijverheidsonderwijs
- Type: Art academy
- Established: 1924
- Location: Frederik Roeskestraat 96, Amsterdam, Netherlands; 52°20′29″N 4°51′36″E
- Website: rietveldacademie.nl

The Gerrit Rietveld Academie, also known as Rietveld School of Art & Design and Rietveld Academy, is an art academy in Amsterdam, Netherlands. It was founded in 1924 and offers programs in fine arts and design.

== History ==
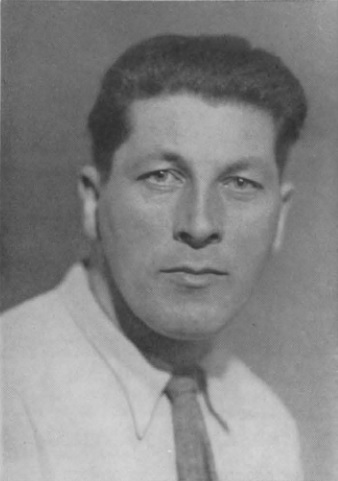
The art academy was named after Gerrit Rietveld (1888–1964)

The Instituut voor Kunstnijverheidsonderwijs (Institute for Arts and Crafts Education) was founded by merging three art schools.

In 1968, following the completion of the Rietveld Building, the school was renamed to Gerrit Rietveld Academie, in honor of Gerrit Rietveld.

From 1939 to 1960, the education provided was influenced by the functionalist and socially critical ideas of De Stijl and the Bauhaus, partly due to the role of the socialist architect Mart Stam as Director of Education.

During the 1960s and 1970s, the school saw an increase in the role and influence of autonomous visual art and individual expression. These influences, combined with a practical focus and a critical mindset, are still a significant part of the academy's image.

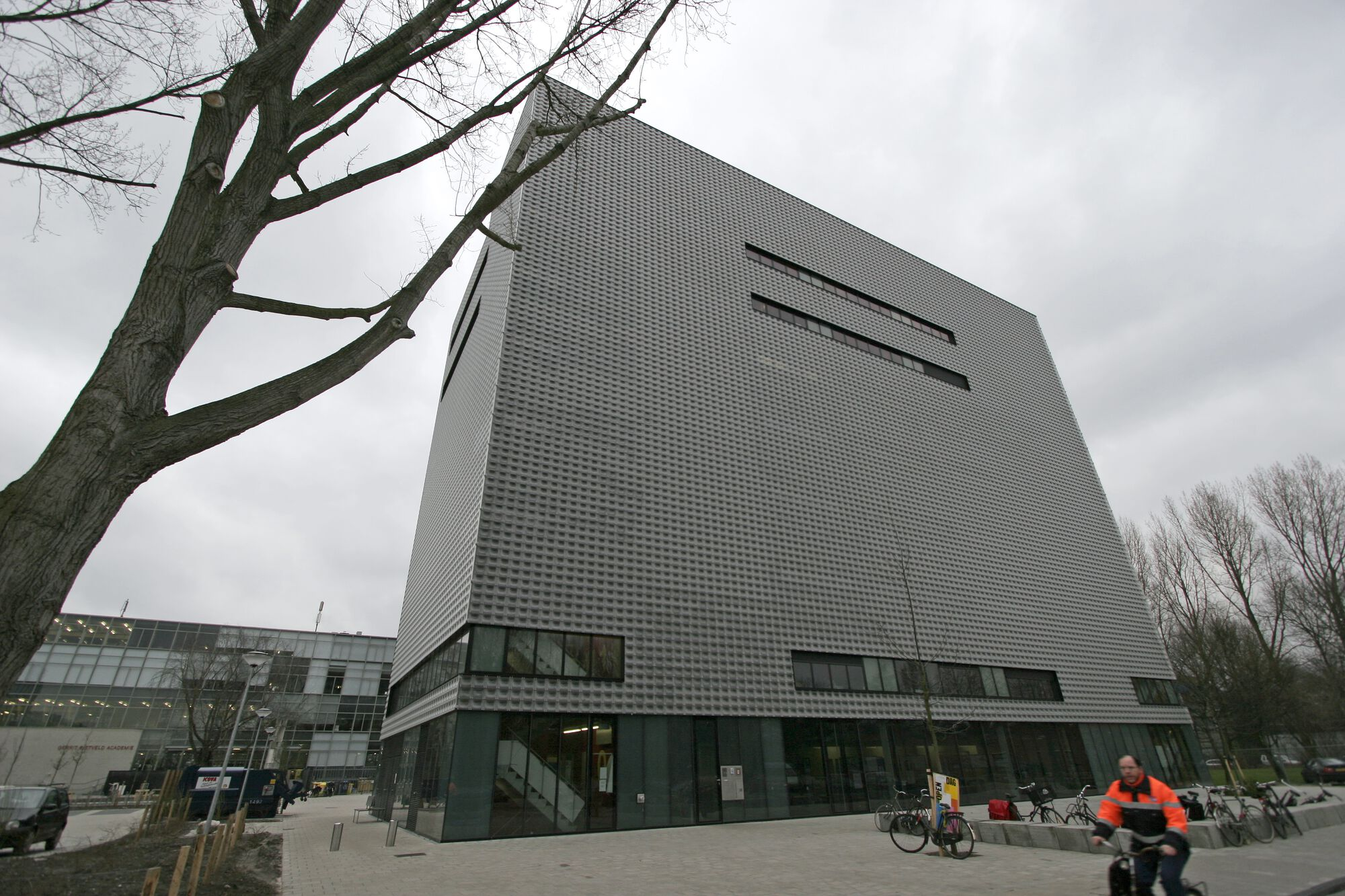
The exterior of the Benthem Crouwel Building, as seen from the road in front of the building with the main building behind it.

In 2003, the Benthem Crouwel Building, designed by Benthem Crouwel Architects, was completed.

In 2019, the Fedlev Building designed by Paulien Bremmer of the Fedlev collective and Hootsmans Architects was completed.

== Buildings ==
=== The Rietveld Building ===
The main building was designed by architect and furniture designer Gerrit Rietveld between 1950 and 1963 and completed in 1966. It is the largest of Gerrit Rietveld’s buildings. There was a long period of preparation between its commission and its completion, during which important developments took place in Rietveld’s way of designing. Gerrit Rietveld did not live to see the building’s completion, as he died while construction was still going on. The academy moved into the building in 1967. Much of the building was renovated in 2004.

=== The Benthem Crouwel Building ===
The second building was designed by Benthem Crouwel Architects and built in 2003 as an expansion of the Rietveld Academie. Studios can be found on the north side of this building, and offices in the south wing. Reception can be found on the ground floor. The south and east facades of the building are clad with 16,000 cast glass elements.

=== FedLev building ===
The third Rietveld Academie building links the existing buildings and the grounds in between, forming a single entity. It has been in full use since January 2019. The building houses, amongst others, the library, the robotics workshop, the wood workshop, several project spaces and the auditorium. The Sandberg Instituut occupies the first floor of the new building.

== Education ==
The Gerrit Rietveld Academy offers two bachelor's and five permanent master's programmes.

- Foundation year: the initial year of the Bachelor's education programme. In this first, formative year, an art-theoretical framework is offered in combination with a practical programme to introduce students to a range of media and techniques.
- Bachelor’s: Within the bachelor's program, it is possible to follow a Bachelor of Fine Arts or a Bachelor of Design. There are various specializations within these two programmes. After a general first year – the foundation year – students choose one of these graduation tracks. This is followed by three years of specialization. The Rietveld Academy also offers part-time education, in which case the foundation year takes two years, followed by three years of specialization.
- Master’s: The master's programmes at the Rietveld Academy are housed within the Sandberg Institute. The five permanent departments at the Sandberg Institute are: Critical Studies, Design, Dirty Art Department, Fine Arts and Studio for Immediate Spaces.
- Preparatory Training & Orientation Year: The Rietveld Academy offers several preparatory training courses for those who want to prepare to study at the Rietveld Academy: a preparatory training year and an orientation year.

There are courses in Architectural Design; Fine Arts; designLAB; Graphic Design; Fashion; Jewellery – Linking Bodies; TXT (Textiles); Image and Language; Photography; Glass; Ceramics; VAV – moving image.

DOGtime, the Rietveld Academy's evening school, offers a two-year foundation programme. This is followed by a three-year degree track, with the choice of the following one of two directions: Autonomous Fine Art, or Interaction, Design, and Unstable Media (IDUM for short).

=== Events ===
Every year, the Rietveld Academy organizes a number of public events, including:

- Rietveld in the Oude Kerk (January/February): In January, the Gerrit Rietveld Academy stages an annual exhibition with approximately 45 students from various departments, in Amsterdam's Oude Kerk.
- Graduation exhibition (July): Every year, the Rietveld Academy's students who are eligible for graduation present their work during the Rietveld's graduation exhibition.
- Rietveld UnCut (November): Much like the Open Day and the graduation exhibition, Rietveld UnCut is an occasion where the academy presents itself to outside world, in all its facets. Rietveld UnCut differs from the Open Day and the graduation exhibition in that it actively seeks to interact with the public.

=== In residence ===
The Rietveld Research Residency (RRR) is a research opportunity for artists, created by the Gerrit Rietveld Academy in cooperation with, among others, the Fonds BKVB. The artists are given the opportunity to work on research project within a period of 1.5 to 3 years.

== Affiliated people ==
=== Notable faculty ===
Partial list of GRA professors, staff, and guest lecturers:

- Bette Adriaanse
- Bart de Baets
- Fons Bemelmans
- Julia Born
- Laurenz Brunner
- Dina Danish
- Experimental Jetset
- Linda van Deursen
- Joris Landman
- Martin Majoor
- Karel Martens
- Luna Maurer
- Q.S. Serafijn
- Henk Trumpie
- Gerard Unger
- Jan van der Vaart
- Sybren Valkema
- Henk van der Waal
- Roel Wouters

=== Notable alumni ===
Since 2023, the academy has maintained an online, searchable database of graduates from the examination year 1968 onward. Notable graduates of Gerrit Rietveld Academie include:

- Frank Ammerlaan
- Marjan van Aubel
- Maria Barnas
- Jaap Berghuis
- Ben van Berkel
- Melanie Bonajo
- Hans Bouman
- Jan des Bouvrie
- Lita Cabellut
- Anna Carlgren
- Wim Crouwel
- Umi Dachlan
- Hans Deuss
- Robbert Dijkgraaf
- Rineke Dijkstra
- Constant Dullaart
- Iris Eichenberg
- Ger van Elk
- Marijke de Goey
- Rebecca Gomperts
- Antonio Jose Guzman
- Hansje van Halem
- Sibyl Heijnen
- Mostafa Heravi
- Boudewijn Ietswaart
- Percy Irausquin
- Rachel de Joode
- Hans de Jong
- Sina Khani
- Peter Klashorst
- Antonin Kratochvil
- Henk Krijger
- Janne Kyttanen
- Maria Lalou
- Jonas Lund
- Geert Lap
- Wietske van Leeuwen
- Ted van Lieshout
- Dana Lixenberg
- Johan van Loon
- Renzo Martens
- Hannie Mein
- Kaweh Modiri
- Edgar Mosa
- Charlotte Mutsaers
- Barbara Nanning
- Ruth Pastine
- Gerard Prent
- Carla van de Puttelaar
- Willem de Rooij
- Julika Rudelius
- Tarik Sadouma
- Anneke Schat
- Wim T. Schippers
- Rob Scholte
- Anami Schrijvers
- Henk Stallinga
- Gerard Unger
- Guido van der Werve
- Abdul Vas
- Thierry Veltman
- Giny Vos

== See also ==
- Notable alumni of the Gerrit Rietveld Academie
- Sandberg Institute
