= Anna Carlgren =

Swedish glass artist

- Born: 1960 (age 65–66); Växjö, Sweden
- Education: Orrefors Glass School, Gerrit Rietveld Academy
- Spouse: Durk Valkema
- Website: www.carlgren.com

Anna Carlgren (pronounced ['ana 'ka:lgre:n]; born July 1960, Växjö) is a Swedish glass artist.

== Education ==
In 1977-78, she studied painting and Chinese calligraphy under Han Bong Duk in Stockholm. From 1978 to 1980, she studied at Orrefors Glass School. She also worked at Kosta Boda (1979), built a studio together with D. Valkema (1980), and was artist-in-residence at Pilchuck Glass School (Stanwood, Washington) where she also lectured. She graduated from the Gerrit Rietveld Academy in Amsterdam in 1983.

== Career ==
Anna Carlgren's first solo exhibition was presented in the glass museum in Växjö, Sweden. Her main focus is transparency and optical phenomena in glass. She writes and lectures on this subject whilst exhibiting her work in museums and galleries all over the world. Her work is included in Jaroslava Brychtova's private collection; the Harvey Littleton Collection; and the collections of Ulla Forsell and Annelies van der Vorm, among others.

In 2002, Carlgren, Durk Valkema, and Annelies van der Vorm decided to create the Vrij Glas Foundation in Zaandam, NL. While an artist-in-residence in Paris 2003-04, Anna Carlgren consulted for IASPIS International Artists’ Studio Program in Sweden and worked on plans for the foundation.

She is one of the founders of the Glasakademin in Sweden, where she has been its acting President for six years and is currently head of the Glasakademin's Commission for Knowledge Transfer.
