= Dutch pavilion =

Venice Biennale national pavilion

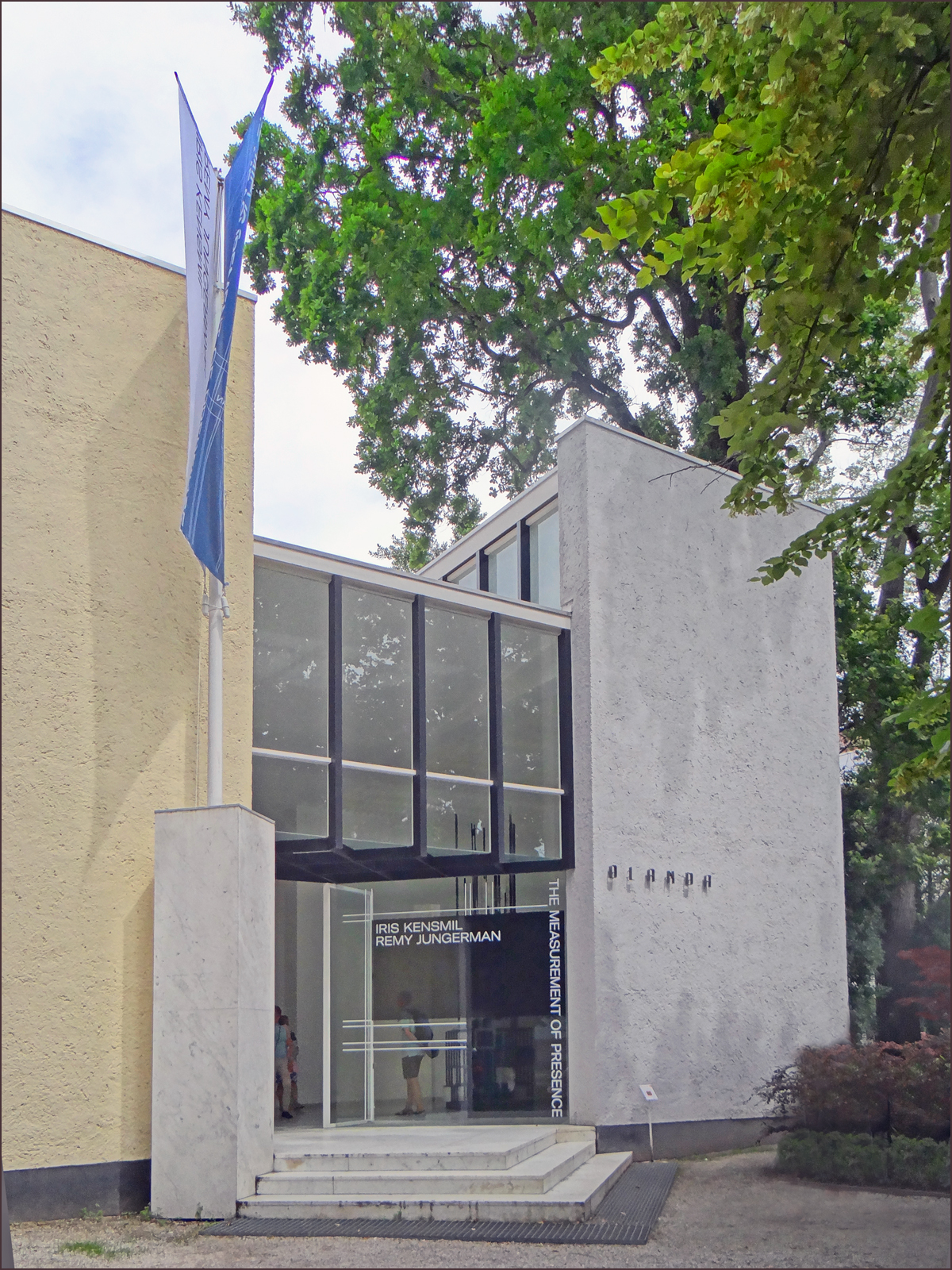
The Dutch pavilion

The Dutch pavilion is an exhibition building that houses the Netherlands's national representation during the Venice Biennale arts festivals.

== Background ==
The Venice Biennale is an international art biennial exhibition held in Venice, Italy. Often described as "the Olympics of the art world", participation in the Biennale is a prestigious event for contemporary artists. The festival has become a constellation of shows: a central exhibition curated by that year's artistic director, national pavilions hosted by individual nations, and independent exhibitions held throughout Venice. The Biennale's parent organisation also runs regular festivals in other arts: architecture, dance, film, music and theatre.

Outside the central international exhibition, individual nations produce their own shows, known as pavilions, as their national representation. Nations that own their pavilion buildings – such as the 30 housed in the Giardini – are responsible for their own upkeep and construction costs as well. Nations without dedicated buildings create pavilions in venues throughout the city.

== Organization and building ==
The pavilion, designed by Ferdinand Boberg, was originally built in 1912. It was later razed and rebuilt in 1953 by Gerrit Thomas Rietveld.

Since 1995, the Mondriaan Foundation has been responsible for the Dutch entry at the Biennale di Venezia, appointing a curator for each entry.

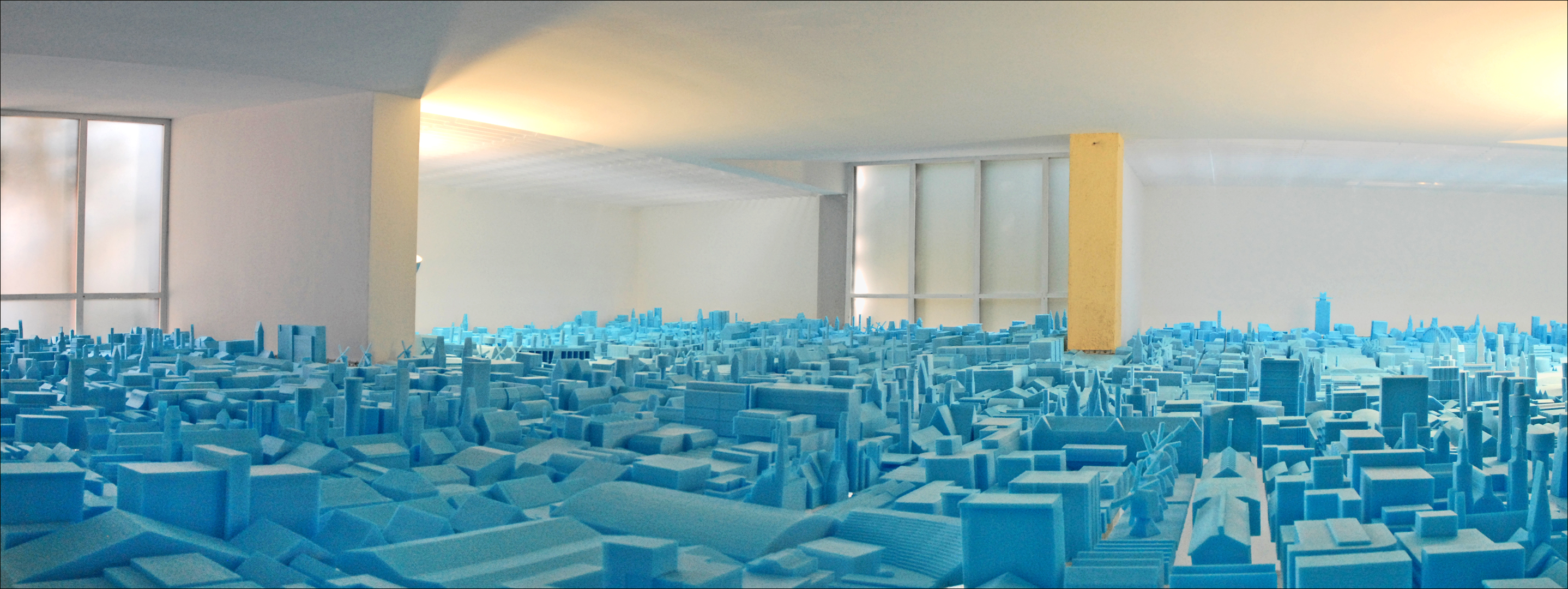
Inside the Dutch pavilion during the Architecture Biennale 2010, while it was housing the art installation Vacant NL, curated by RAAAF.

== Representation by year ==
=== Art ===
- 1956 — Constant, Bart van der Leck, Piet Mondriaan, André Volten
- 1964 — Karel Appel, Lucebert, J. Mooy
- 1966 — Constant Nieuwenhuys with paintings, sculptures, New Babylon objects, watercolors and drawings
- 1968 — Carel Visser
- 1970 — Willem Graatsma, Jan Slothouber
- 1972 — Jan Dibbets
- 1974 — (no biennal)
- 1976 — Jan Dibbets, Jerry de Keizer, Herman Herzberger
- 1978 — Douwe Jan Bakker, Sjoerd Buisman, Krijn Giezen, Hans de Vries
- 1980 — Ger van Elk
- 1982 — Stanley Brouwn
- 1984 — Armando
- 1986 — Reinier Lucassen
- 1988 — Henk Visch
- 1990 — Rob Scholte

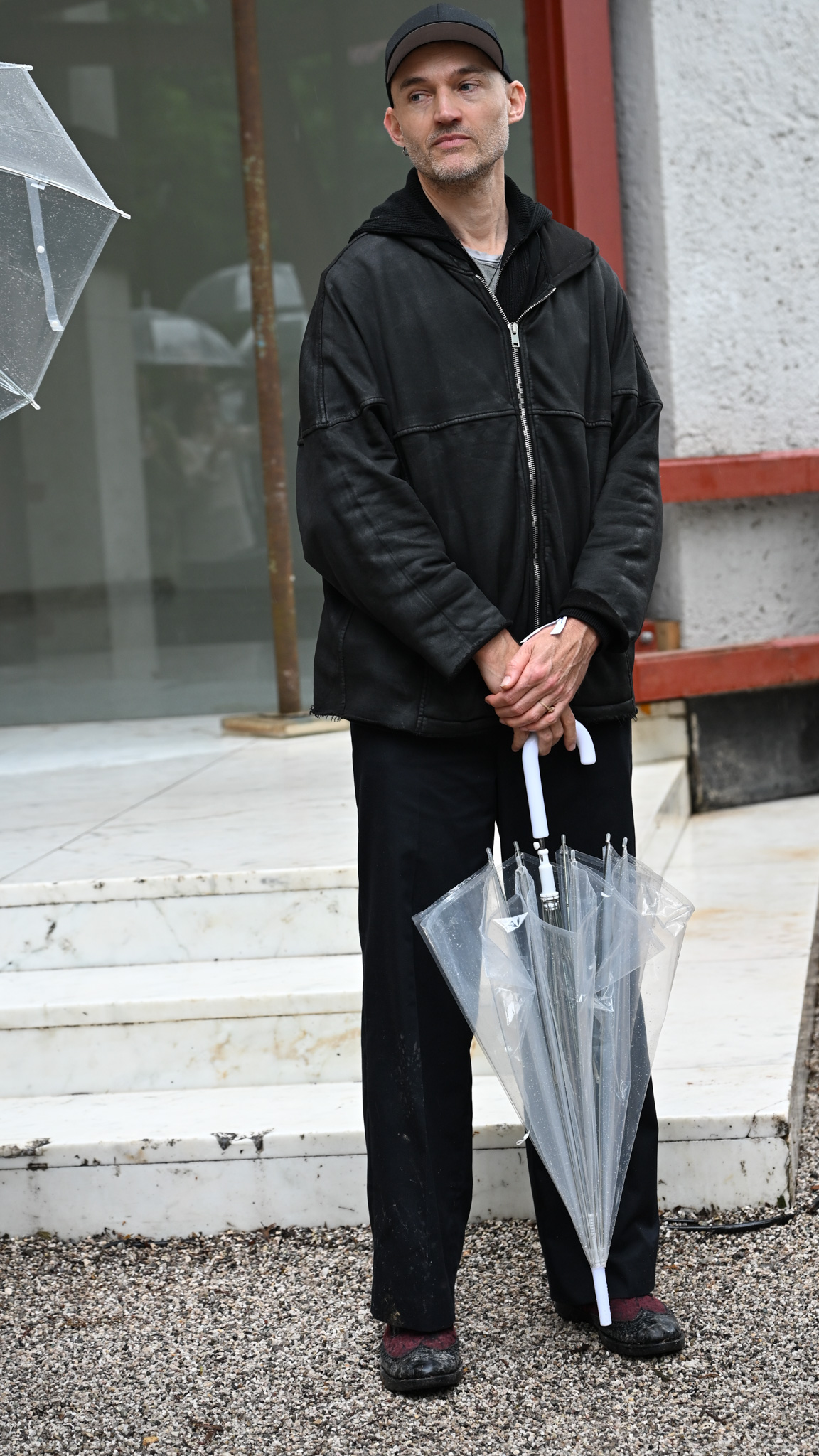
Dries Verhoeven at the Biennale di Venezia 2026

- 1993 — Niek Kemps
- 1995 — Marlene Dumas, Maria Roosen, Marijke van Warmerdam (Curator: Chris Dercon)
- 1997 — Aernout Mik, Willem Oorebeek (Curators: Leontine Coelewij, Arno van Roosmalen)
- 1999 — Daan van Golden (Curator: Karel Schampers)
- 2001 — Liza May Post (Curator: Jaap Guldemond)
- 2003 — Carlos Amorales, Alicia Framis, Meschac Gaba, Jeanne van Heeswijk, Erik van Lieshout (Curator: Rein Wolfs)
- 2005 — Jeroen De Rijke / Willem de Rooij (Curator: Martijn van Nieuwenhuyzen)
- 2007 — Aernout Mik (Curator Maria Hlavajova)
- 2009 — Fiona Tan (Curator: Saskia Bos)
- 2010 — Ronald Rietveld, Erik Rietveld, Jurgen Bey, Joost Grootens, Barbara Visser, Landstra & De Vries, Claus Wiersma, Saskia van Stein (Curator: RAAAF)
- 2011 — Barbara Visser, Ernst van der Hoeven, Herman Verkerk, Johannes Schwartz, Joke Robaard, Maureen Mooren, Paul Kuipers, Sanneke van Hassel, Yannis Kyriakides (Curator: Guus Beumer)
- 2013 — Mark Manders (Curator: Lorenzo Benedetti)
- 2015 — Herman de Vries (Curators: Colin Huizing, Cees de Boer)
- 2017 — Wendelien van Oldenborgh (Curator: Lucy Cotter)
- 2019 — Remy Jungerman, Iris Kensmil (Curator: Benno Tempel)
- 2024 — Cercle d’Art des Travailleurs de Plantation Congolaise (CATPC) (Curator: Hicham Khalidi in collaboration with Renzo Martens)
- 2026 — Dries Verhoeven (Curator: Rieke Vos)

In 2022 the Dutch representation (Melanie Bonajo (Curators: Orlando Maaike Gouwenberg, Geir Haraldseth and Soraya Pol)) will not take place in the Rietveld building, but in the Chiesetta della Misericordia, while the Rietveld pavilion will be used for the Estonian exhibition.

== Bibliography ==
- Russeth, Andrew (April 17, 2019). "The Venice Biennale: Everything You Could Ever Want to Know". ARTnews.
- Volpi, Cristiana (2013). "Netherlands". In Re Rebaudengo, Adele (ed.). Pavilions and Garden of Venice Biennale. Rome: Contrasto. p. 185. ISBN 978-88-6965-440-4.
