= Michel Waisvisz =

Dutch inventor and musician

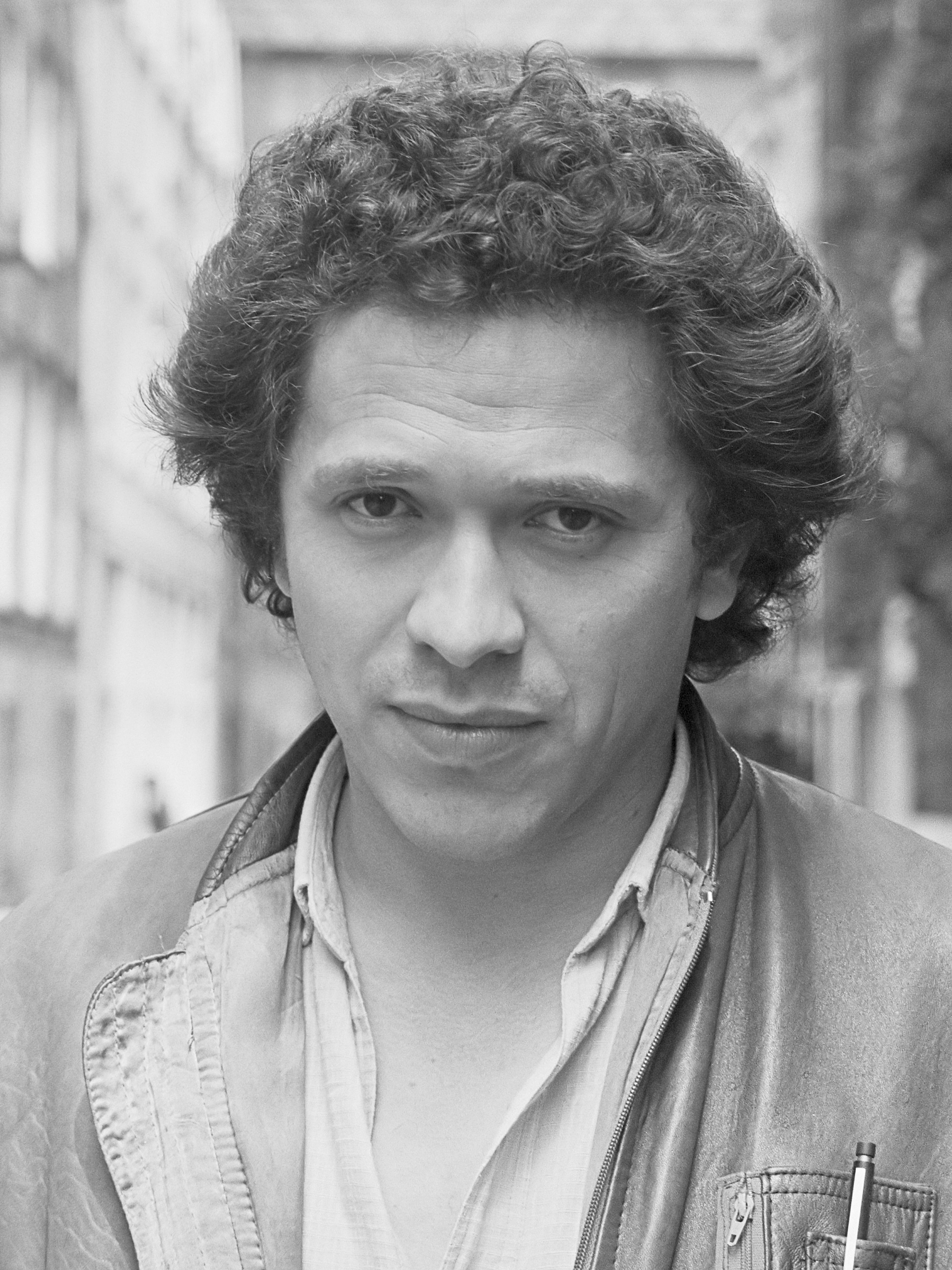
Michel Waisvisz (1981)

Michel Waisvisz (/ˈvaɪsvɪs/ VYSSE-viss; 8 July 1949, Leiden – 18 June 2008, Amsterdam) was a Dutch composer, performer and inventor of experimental electronic musical instruments. He was the artistic director of STEIM in Amsterdam from 1981, where he collaborated with musicians and artists from all over the world.

== Biography ==
His involvement with STEIM goes back to 1969, when it was co-founded by his mentor and friend Dick Raaymakers. He was a member of Amsterdam's Electric Music Theatre scene of the 1970s, performing intensively and raising critical voices against the upcoming high-tech culture. He co-founded and organised the first sound festival in the Netherlands:The Claxon Sound Festival.

Waisvisz had a passionate dedication to a physical, bodily approach to electronic music which he expressed in the use and presentation of his many developments of hardware and software instruments. From his point of view, electronic music is created in direct musical interaction with individual technology, allowing for instant travels into sound through improvisation. This multidimensionality in electronic musical practice has been summed up in the expression of touch in a 1998 essay written together with Joel Ryan and Sally Jane Norman.

== Discography ==
- 1974 Lumps (with Steve Lacy (saxophonist), Han Bennick, Maarten Van Regteren Altena)
- 1978 Crackle
- 2005 In Tune
- 2008 Shortwave (with Christine Sehnanoui)

=== Appears On ===
- 1974 Steve Lacy (saxophonist) - Saxophone Special
- 1987 New Computer Music (WERGO)

== Musical instruments ==
Hardware Instruments:
TapePuller (1970): an instrument to play seated, pulling a tape with both feet over the tapehead, thus using the recording medium in a performative manner.

CrackleBox (1974): a portable instrument with batteries and a built-in speaker. The oscillator is played by the direct touch of the fingers on the exposed contacts of the circuit. The player's skin becomes part of the circuit.

CrackleSynth (1974): Michel Waisvisz' individual synthesizer. After bending a VCS3 Synth (the "Putney") in the early 70s to play it with a touchable "crackle" surface, this three voiced instrument became Michel Waisvisz' synthesizer development. It has 12 keys with tuning knobs combined with three crackle-patches.

The Hands (1984): One year after the MIDI standard had been introduced, Waisvisz built the first experimental interface making use of sensor data converted into MIDI. The two wooden frames attached to both hands let him play music with hand and arm movements, tilting gestures, and fingered playing. Converting analog sensor data into digital musical data has become a major issue at STEIM in the 1990s, introducing the mini computer The SensorLab.

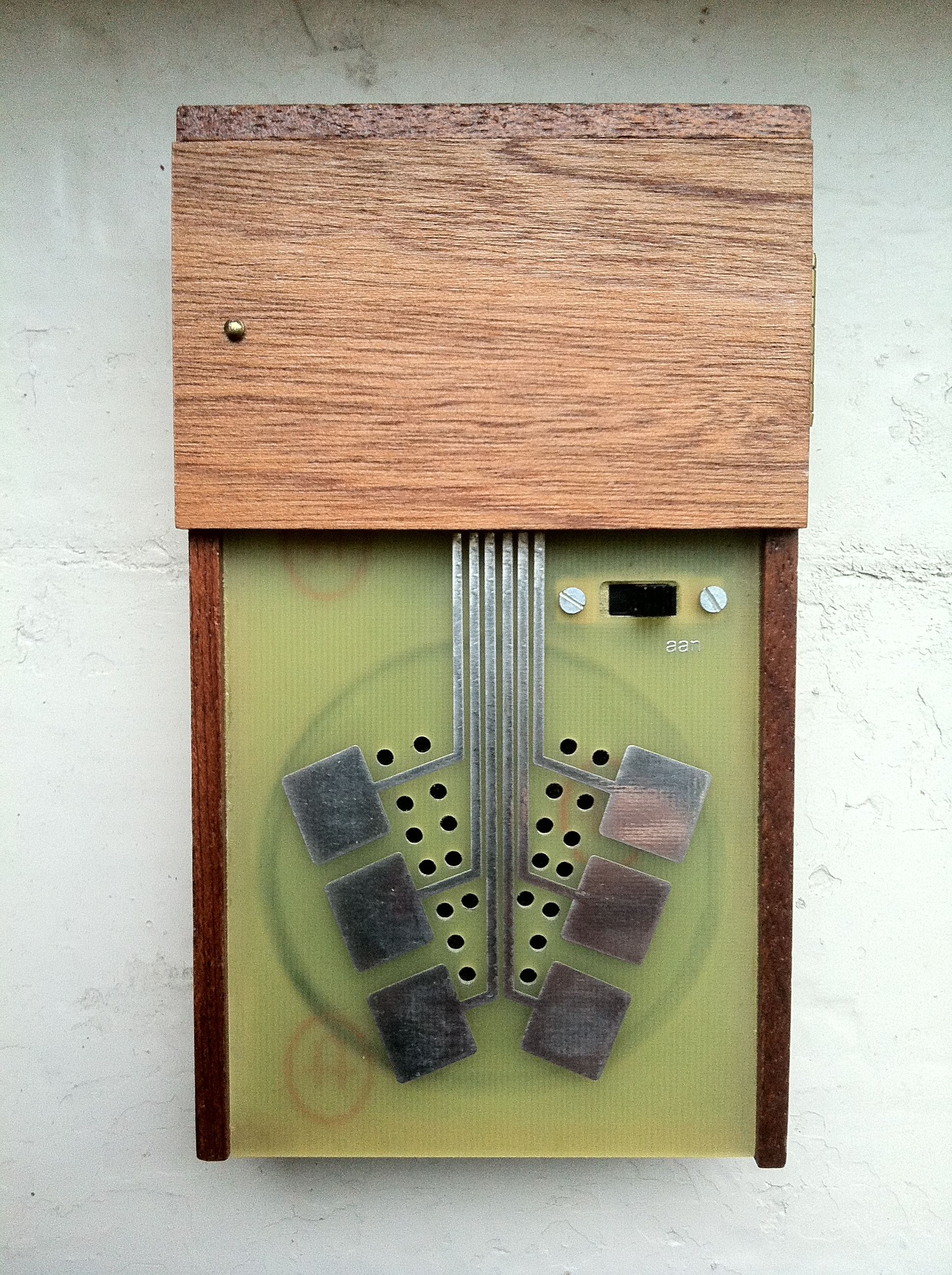
Crackle Box

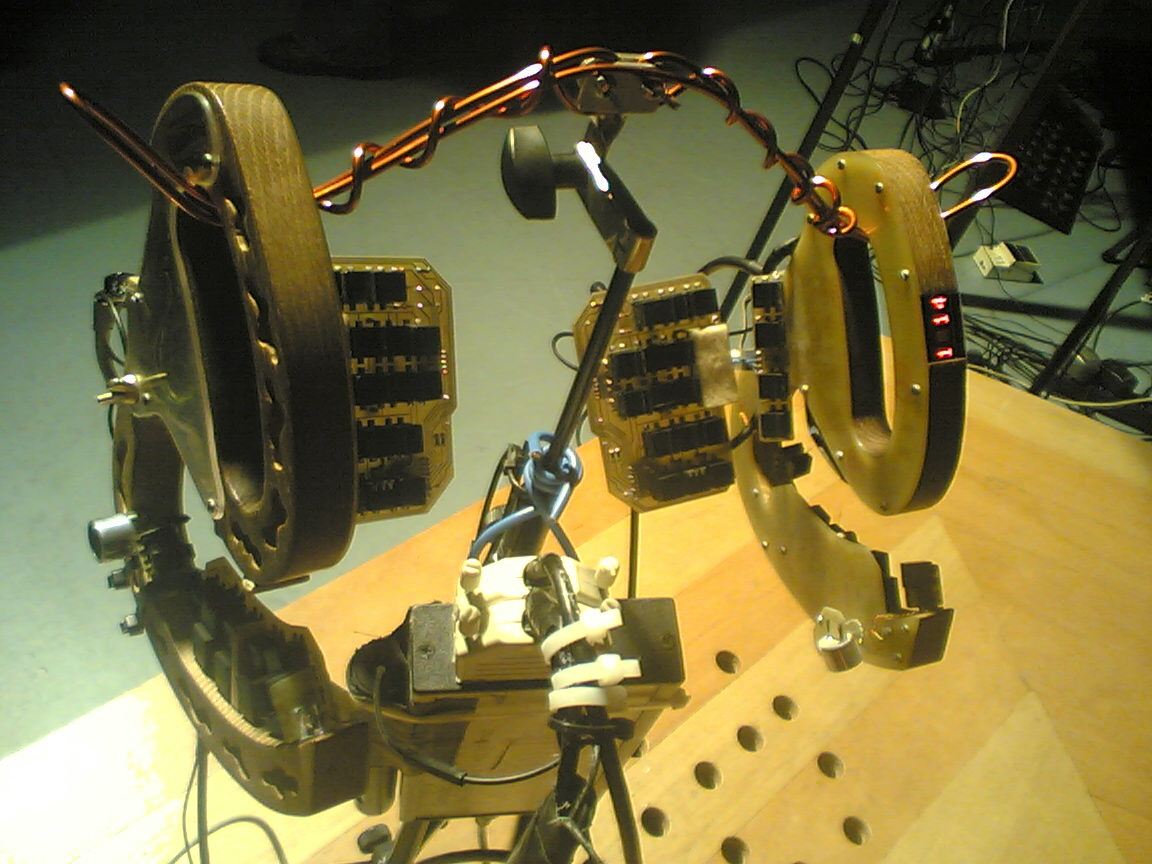
The Hands

=== Software instruments ===
He has also worked on the creation of software instruments, developed with STEIM's programmer Frank Baldé:

- LiSa (Live-Sampling Instrument, since 1995)

Software for the Mac, processing live audio input, or data from the memory in a most versatile way.

- JunXion (Sensor-to-Midi Matrix, since 2002):

Converting sensor data into musical data today can be done by every laptop computer.

The Energetica Project (since 2005) "Energetica" is Waisvisz' vision of electricity provided for electronic instruments by the effort of the player him/ herself, theoretically developed in the last years of his life. As he has always fought pre-configurations and built-in directions in technology, the subjection to the communal power supplies.

== Collaborations ==
Michel Waisvisz' collaborations include performances with Maarten Altena, Laurie Anderson, Tarek Atoui, Frank Baldé, Lodewijk de Boer, Willem Breuker, Peter Brötzmann, Najib Cheradi, John Cameron (Claw Boys Claw), Truus de Groot, Gunter Hampel, Paul Hubweber, Shelley Hirsch, Mazen Kerbaj, Steve Lacy, Misha Mengelberg, Patrizia van Roessel, Joel Ryan, Christine Sehnoaui, Fausto Senese, Shusaku, Laetitia Sonami, DJ sniff, DJ Spooky, Richard Teitelbaum, Moniek Toebosch, Jan St. Werner, Frans Zwartjes.
