= Toon Verhoef =

Dutch artist and lecturer (born 1946)

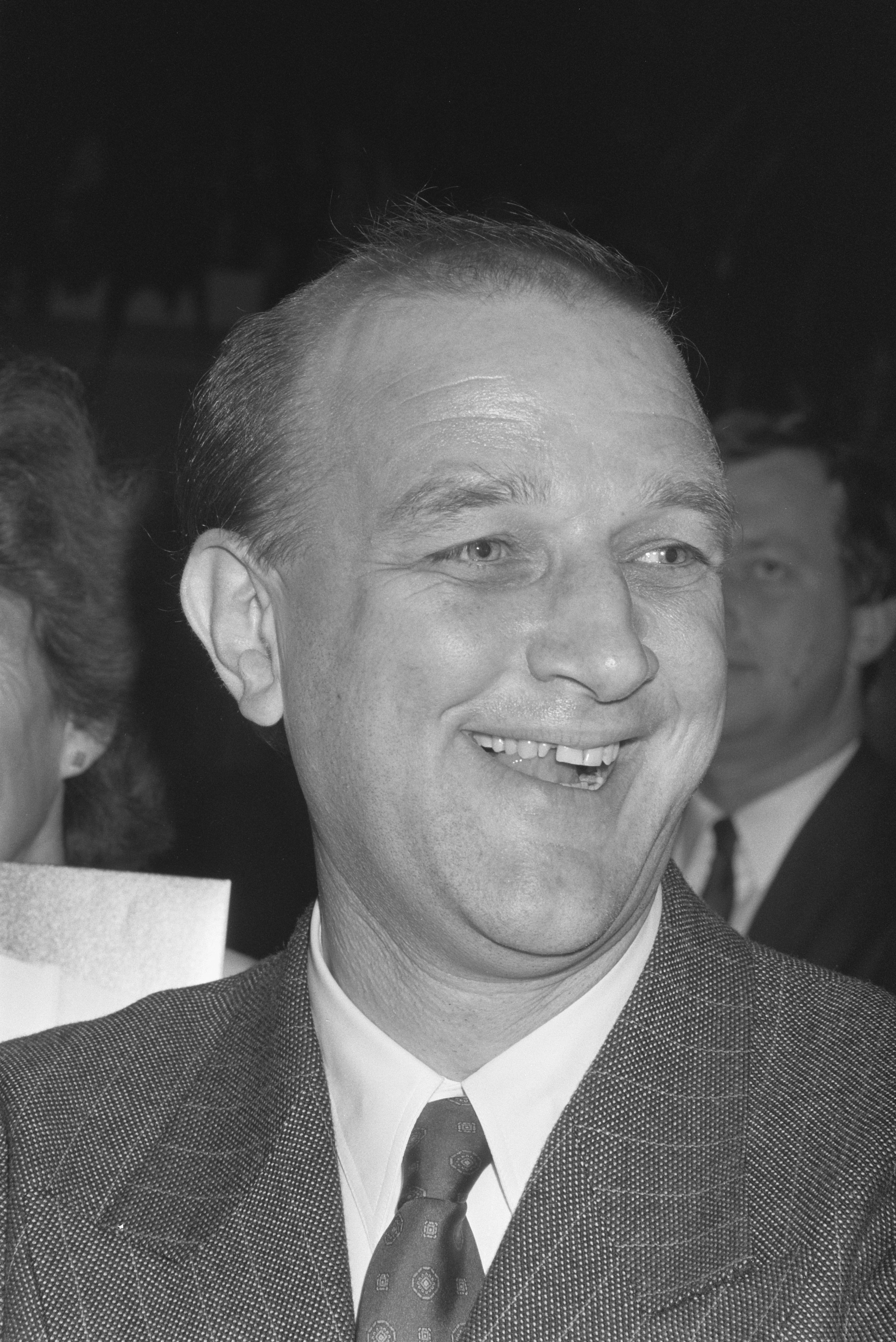
Toon Verhoef, 1988

Anthonie Wilhelmus (Toon) Verhoef (born Voorburg, October 17, 1946) is a Dutch painter, ceramist and art lecturer.

== Biography ==
Verhoef attended the Rijksakademie in Amsterdam in 1965-1966, and studied art history at the University of South Africa in Johannesburg from 1966 to 1968. Subsequently, he received further art education at the Ateliers '63 in Haarlem from 1968 to 1970.

Verhoef settled as independent artist and over the years worked in Eindhoven, Buenos Aires in Argentina, Wales, Amsterdam, Johannesburg (South-Africa), Haarlem, Edam, New York City, and Hanover (New Hampshire). In 1975 he was appointed art lecturer at the De Ateliers in Amsterdam, where he lecturer until 2003. From 1981 to 1984 he also lectured at the Academie Minerva in Groningen; at the Academie voor Beeldende Vorming Tilburg (ABV) in 1983-1984; at the Villa Arson in Nice in 1983-1984, and at the Staatliche Akademie der Bildenden Künste Karlsruhe from 2009 to 2014.

Verhoef was awarded the Buning Brongers Award in 1980, the Sandberg Prize in 1985, and the Dr A.H. Heineken Prize for Art in 1988.

== Selected publications ==
- Toon Verhoef, Carel Visser, Toon Verhoef, Carel Visser: de lakenhal-leiden 4/4 - 26/5 1974., 1974.
- Toon Verhoef, Stedelijk Van Abbemuseum (1986). Toon Verhoef - schilderijen en tekeningen, 1968-1986.
- Toon Verhoef, Castello di Rivoli (Museum : Rivoli, Italy). (1989). Toon Verhoef: Castello di Rivoli, 6 ottobre-3 dicembre 1989.
- Rudi H. Fuchs, Galerie Onrust (2013). Toon Verhoef: 12 schilderijen, 2012-2013.
