= Gerard Prent =

Dutch painter

Gerard Prent (born 25 December 1954 in Amsterdam) is a contemporary Dutch painter.

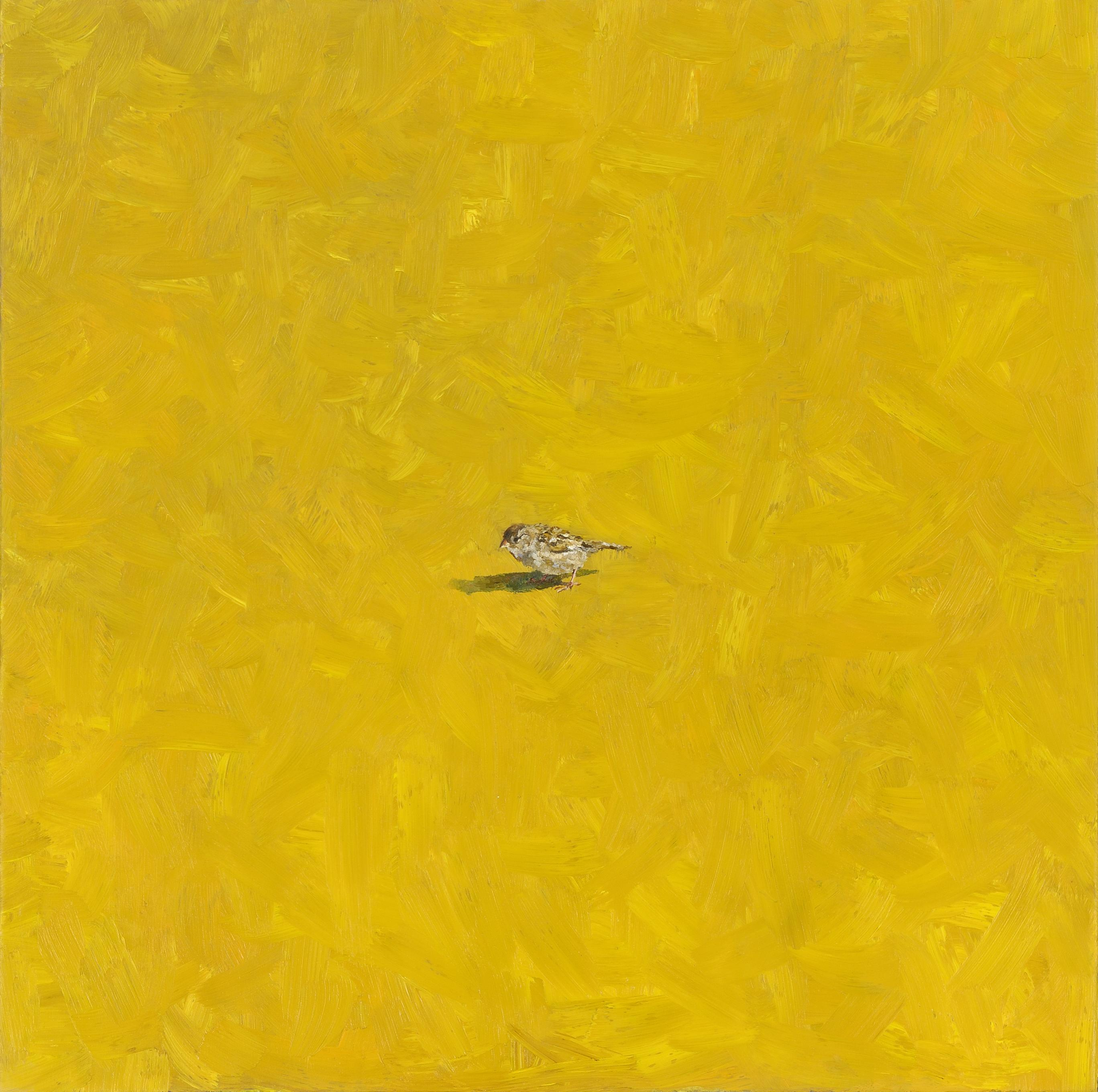
Untitled, (sparrow) 2 x 2 meters

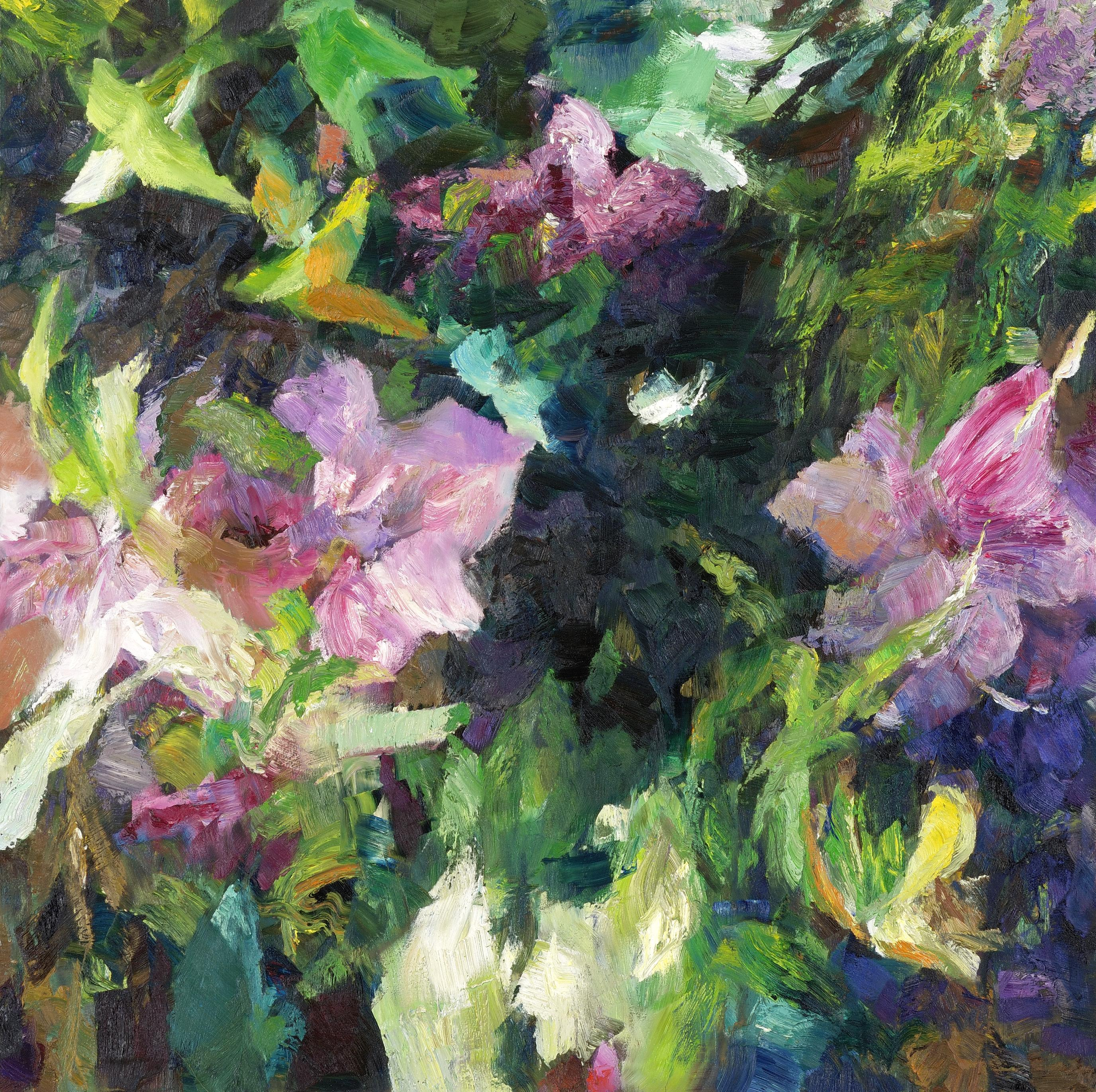
Untitled, (garden) 2 x 2 meters

== Life and work ==
Gerard Prent had his art education in Amsterdam at the Rietveld Academy (1973–1978) and the Rijksakademie (1978–1980). His first canvases utilized large, lively colored fields, often set in divergent frames. From the very beginning of his career, he has shown a preference for large, square formats for his paintings.

He was commissioned to create murals in the newly constructed government buildings in the Netherlands, such as the customs office in Vlissingen, the correctional facilities of Zwolle and Heerhugowaard, and the Dutch Ministry of Foreign Affairs in The Hague. It was within these structures that his work developed in a more anecdotal and allegorical mode; while exploring various kinds of media, submerging the painting for the time being.

After an attempt to move away from art, the muse, after having nearly throttled him, took hold of him and has not let go. His attempt to live outside of art in France was the catalyst for his discovery of the joy of painting through the simplicity of his subject and the emphasis on the transparency of his palette. Add he was looking for study material in the Amsterdam Zoo (Artis), the sparrow forced itself upon him, as a free and everyday subject. The little bird ended up in the center of a square canvas, with the painter's experiment (or experience) happening in the large background of the painting. The sparrow continues unmoved by the surrounding landscape, becoming mythic in its serenity and through the use of reproduction.

Gerard Prent created a large series of “Mussen” (Sparrows in Dutch), of which many paintings found their way to collectors and admirers. The simplicity of the subject has remained: from 2004 onwards Prent continues to paint just a simple corner in the garden, or a spot on the side of the road, with large strokes and exuberant colours and shapes. According to Gerard Prent, it is not the subject that matters, but the image, the creation of pure art.

== Prizes ==
- 1979: Willem F.C. Uriotprice, painting
- 1979: Silver medal Dutch Prix de Rome painting category
- 1984: Titia Buning-Bongers price
