= John Duncan (neuroscientist) =

British neuroscientist

John Duncan (born 16 May 1953) is a British neuroscientist.

After completing his education at the University of Oxford in 1976, Duncan worked for two years with Michael Posner at the University of Oregon, and then worked at the Medical Research Council (MRC). As of 2018, he is Programme Leader at the MRC's Cognition and Brain Sciences Unit in Cambridge; he is also a Professorial Research Fellow in the Department of Experimental Psychology at the University of Oxford and a Fellow of St John's College, Oxford.

== Honours ==
Duncan was elected a Fellow of the Royal Society in 2008 and a Fellow of the British Academy in 2009. In 2012, he was awarded the Heineken Prize for Cognitive Science by the Royal Netherlands Academy of Arts and Sciences.
