= Heineken Prizes =

Dutch arts and sciences awards

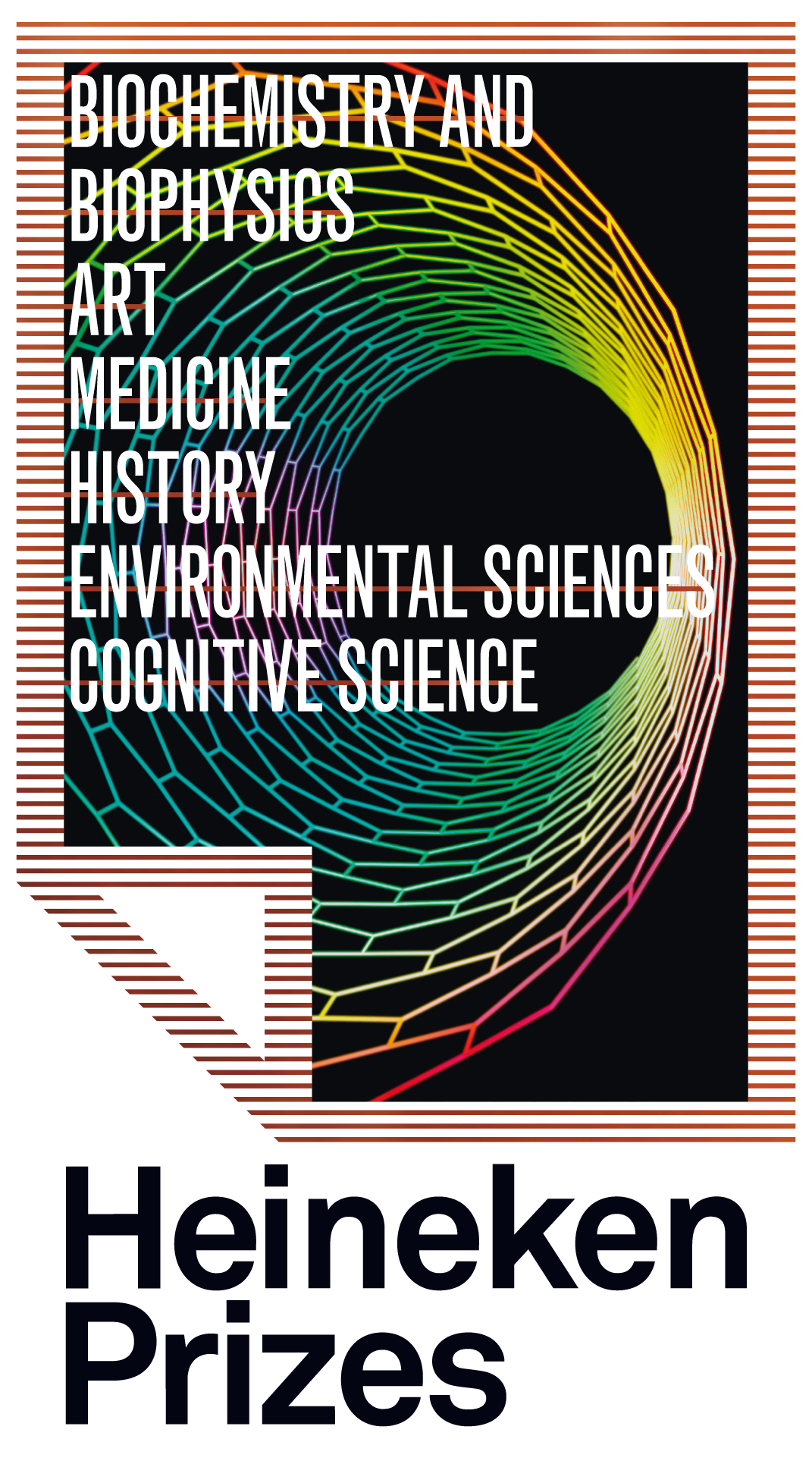
Logo Heineken prize

The Heineken Prizes for Arts and Sciences consist of 11 awards biannually bestowed by Royal Netherlands Academy of Arts and Sciences. The prizes are named in honor of Henry Pierre Heineken, son of founder Gerard Adriaan Heineken, Alfred Heineken, former chairman of Heineken Holdings, and Charlene de Carvalho-Heineken, current chair of the Heineken Prizes Foundations, which fund all Heineken Prizes for Arts and Sciences. Thirteen winners of the Dr H. P. Heineken Prize for Biochemistry and Biophysics or the Dr A. H. Heineken Prize for Medicine subsequently were awarded a Nobel Prize.

== Organization ==
The five science prizes ($200,000 each) are:
1. Dr H. P. Heineken Prize for Biochemistry and Biophysics
2–4. Dr A. H. Heineken Prizes for History, Medicine and Environmental Sciences
5. C. L. de Carvalho-Heineken Prize for Cognitive Sciences

In 1988, the Dr A. H. Heineken Prize for Art was established to be awarded to an outstanding artist working in the Netherlands. The prize is €100,000, half of which is to be spent on a publication and/or exhibit.

Since 2010, Heineken Young Scientists Awards are given to young talent in similar research fields as the Dr H. P. Heineken, Dr A. H. Heineken and C. L. de Carvalho-Heineken Prizes.

== Selection ==
The selection system of the Heineken Prizes can be compared to that of the Nobel Prizes. Scientists from all over the world are invited to nominate fellow scientists for the Heineken Prizes. The Royal Netherlands Academy appoints special committees consisting of eminent scientists and chaired by a member of the board of one of the academy's two divisions. Both members and nonmembers of the academy are eligible for membership of these committees. An independent jury of members of the academy, acting in a personal capacity, chooses the winners of the Dr A. H. Heineken Prize for Art.

The Heineken Prizes are awarded in a special session of the Royal Netherlands Academy of Arts and Sciences, which takes place every even year at the Beurs van Berlage in Amsterdam. In 2002, 2004, 2006, 2008, 2010 and 2012 the Prizes were presented by the Prince of Orange.

== List of laureates ==
=== Dr H. P. Heineken Prize for Biochemistry and Biophysics ===
- 2024 Ruedi Aebersold, Matthias Mann
- 2022 Carolyn Bertozzi
- 2020 Bruce Stillman
- 2018 Xiaowei Zhuang
- 2016 Jennifer Doudna
- 2014 Christopher Dobson
- 2012 Titia de Lange
- 2010 Franz-Ulrich Hartl
- 2008 Jack W. Szostak
- 2006 Alec J. Jeffreys
- 2004 Andrew Z. Fire
- 2002 Roger Y. Tsien
- 2000 James Rothman
- 1998 Anthony J. Pawson
- 1996 Paul M. Nurse
- 1994 Michael J. Berridge
- 1992 Piet Borst
- 1990 Philip Leder
- 1988 Thomas R. Cech
- 1985 Bela Julesz and Werner E. Reichardt
- 1982 Charles Weissmann
- 1979 Aaron Klug
- 1976 Laurens L. M. van Deenen
- 1973 Christian de Duve
- 1970 Britton Chance
- 1967 Jean L. A. Brachet
- 1964 Erwin Chargaff

=== Dr A. H. Heineken Prize for Medicine ===
- 2022 Vishva M. Dixit
- 2020 Karl Deisseroth
- 2018 Peter Carmeliet
- 2016 Stephen Jackson
- 2014 Kari Alitalo
- 2012 Hans Clevers
- 2010 Ralph Steinman
- 2008 Sir Richard Peto
- 2006 Mary-Claire King
- 2004 Elizabeth H. Blackburn
- 2002 Dennis Selkoe
- 2000 Eric R. Kandel
- 1998 Barry J. Marshall
- 1996 David de Wied
- 1994 Luc Montagnier
- 1992 Salvador Moncada
- 1990 Johannes J. van Rood
- 1989 Paul C. Lauterbur

=== Dr A. H. Heineken Prize for Environmental Sciences ===
- 2022 Carl Folke
- 2020 Corinne Le Quéré
- 2018 Paul D. N. Hebert
- 2016 Georgina Mace
- 2014 Jaap Sinninghe Damsté
- 2012 William Laurance
- 2010 David Tilman
- 2008 Bert Brunekreef
- 2006 Stuart L. Pimm
- 2004 Simon A. Levin
- 2002 Lonnie G. Thompson
- 2000 Poul Harremoës
- 1998 Paul R. Ehrlich
- 1996 Herman Daly
- 1994 BirdLife International (Colin J. Bibby)
- 1992 Marko Branica
- 1990 James E. Lovelock

=== Dr A. H. Heineken Prize for History ===
- 2022 Sunil Amrith
- 2020 Lorraine Daston
- 2018 J. R. McNeill
- 2016 Judith Herrin
- 2014 Aleida Assmann
- 2012 Geoffrey Parker
- 2010 Rosamond McKitterick
- 2008 Jonathan Israel
- 2006 Joel Mokyr
- 2004 Jacques Le Goff
- 2002 Heinz Schilling
- 2000 Jan de Vries
- 1998 Mona Ozouf
- 1996 Heiko A. Oberman
- 1994 Peter R.L. Brown
- 1992 Herman Van der Wee
- 1990 Peter Gay

=== C.L. de Carvalho-Heineken Prize for Cognitive Sciences (before 2014: Dr A. H. Heineken Prize for Cognitive Sciences) ===
- 2022 Kia Nobre
- 2020 Robert Zatorre
- 2018 Nancy Kanwisher
- 2016 Elizabeth Spelke
- 2014 James McClelland
- 2012 John Duncan
- 2010 Michael Tomasello
- 2008 Stanislas Dehaene
- 2006 John R. Anderson

=== Dr A. H. Heineken Prize for Art ===
- 2022 Remy Jungerman
- 2020 Ansuya Blom
- 2018 Erik van Lieshout
- 2016 Yvonne Dröge Wendel
- 2014 Wendelien van Oldenborgh
- 2012 Peter Struycken
- 2010 Mark Manders
- 2008 Barbara Visser
- 2006 Job Koelewijn
- 2004 Daan van Golden
- 2002 Aernout Mik
- 2000 Guido Geelen
- 1998 Jan van de Pavert
- 1996 Karel Martens
- 1994 Matthijs Röling
- 1992 Carel Visser
- 1990 Marrie Bot
- 1988 Toon Verhoef

== Nobel Prizes ==
The following winners of the Heineken Prizes for Medicine and Biochemistry and Biophysics have since won a Nobel Prize:

- Christian de Duve
  - Dr. H. P. Heineken Prize for Biochemistry and Biophysics 1973
  - Nobel Prize in Physiology or Medicine 1974
- Aaron Klug
  - Dr. H. P. Heineken Prize for Biochemistry and Biophysics 1979
  - Nobel Prize in Chemistry 1982
- Thomas Cech
  - Dr. H. P. Heineken Prize for Biochemistry and Biophysics 1988
  - Nobel Prize in Chemistry 1989
- Paul C. Lauterbur
  - Dr. A. H. Heineken Prize for Medicine 1989
  - Nobel Prize in Physiology or Medicine 2003
- Paul Nurse
  - Dr. H. P. Heineken Prize for Biochemistry and Biophysics 1996
  - Nobel Prize in Physiology or Medicine 2001
- Barry J. Marshall
  - Dr. A. H. Heineken Prize for Medicine 1998
  - Nobel Prize in Physiology or Medicine 2005
- Eric R. Kandel
  - Dr. A. H. Heineken Prize for Medicine in 2000
  - Nobel Prize in Physiology or Medicine 2000
- Andrew Z. Fire
  - Dr. H. P. Heineken Prize for Biochemistry and Biophysics 2004
  - Nobel Prize in Physiology or Medicine 2006
- Roger Y. Tsien
  - Dr. H. P. Heineken Prize for Biochemistry and Biophysics 2002
  - Nobel Prize in Chemistry 2008
- Jack W. Szostak
  - Dr. H. P. Heineken Prize for Biochemistry and Biophysics 2008
  - Nobel Prize in Physiology or Medicine 2009
- Elizabeth Blackburn
  - Dr. A. H. Heineken Prize for Medicine 2004
  - Nobel Prize in Physiology or Medicine 2009
- Ralph M. Steinman
  - Dr. A. H. Heineken Prize for Medicine 2010
  - Nobel Prize in Physiology or Medicine 2011
- Carolyn Bertozzi
  - Dr H. P. Heineken Prize for Biochemistry and Biophysics 2022
  - Nobel Prize in Chemistry 2022

== See also ==
- List of European art awards
