= Job Koelewijn =

Dutch artist (born 1962)

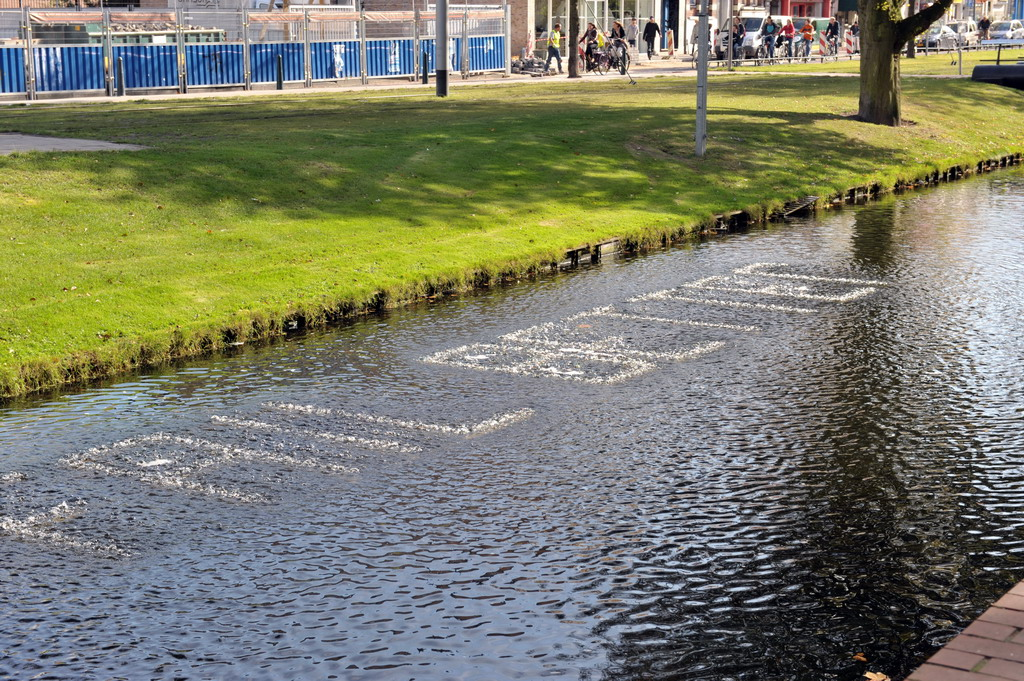
No Matter. Try Again. Fail Again. Fail Better, sculpture in Rotterdam.

Jacob Rutger (Job) Koelewijn (born Spakenburg, February 15, 1962) is a Dutch artist, who works as conceptual artist, sculptor, installation artist, performance artist, and photographer.

== Life and work ==
Koelewijn decided to become an artist in 1984 after he had been seriously injured in a traffic accident. The subsequent years became a quest for deepening of live. He studied at the Rietveld Academy in Amsterdam from 1987 to 1992, and then spent a year at the Sandberg Institute. In his graduation project, he let his family dressed in Spakenburg costume clean the exhibition pavilion by Gerrit Rietveld.

In 1987 he settled in Amsterdam as independent artist. In 1996 he worked a period in the MoMA PS1 in New York, a center for contemporary art, which is attached to the Museum of Modern Art. He then returned to Amsterdam.

Koelewijn was awarded the Charlotte Köhler Prize in 1996, the Sandberg Prize of the Amsterdam Arts Fund in 1999, the Westinghouse Art Prize in 2002, and the Dr A.H. Heineken Prize for Art in 2006.

== Work ==
Koelewijn his work consists of installations, photographs, objects and multiples. Many of his works appeal to several senses. For example, he makes use of baby powder, inhalation ointment, ice or cubes to express himself. He made a tombstone of baby powder with the inscription "Vitality," entitled "Marsman ... goodbye," and a room that he occupied entirely in poetry wrapped cubes.

In 1996 Koelewijn had an exhibition called "Two openings" in the Fons Welters gallery in Amsterdam. For the artwork "The world is my oyster," he cut in a wall of the gallery a hole the size of a football, in which the viewer could watch into the neighbors garden of the gallery.

In spring 2008 there was a retrospective of Koelewijn work at the De Pont Museum of Contemporary Art in Tilburg, entitled Loco Motion. The installation shown are linked to time without mercy and books, as carriers of knowledge, are uses as energy. The exhibition already starts at the square in front of the museum, where the artist confronts the audience with a mobile cinema but without the famous white cloth. Under music of Ennio Morricone you just look at a square and lined sac.
