= Ansuya Blom =

Dutch artist (born 1956)

- Born: 1956 (age 69–70)
- Occupation: Artist
- Awards: Heineken Prize (2020)

Ansuya Blom (born 1956) is a Dutch artist. In 2020, she received the Heineken Prize for Art. Her work is included in the collections of the Stedelijk Museum Amsterdam and Tate.

== Publications ==
- Below the Underground: Ansuya Blom, edited Ansuya Blom, Laurie Cluitmans, Eleonoor Jap Sam, published by Jap Sam Books / Centraal Museum, 2024.
