= Thom Puckey =

British artist

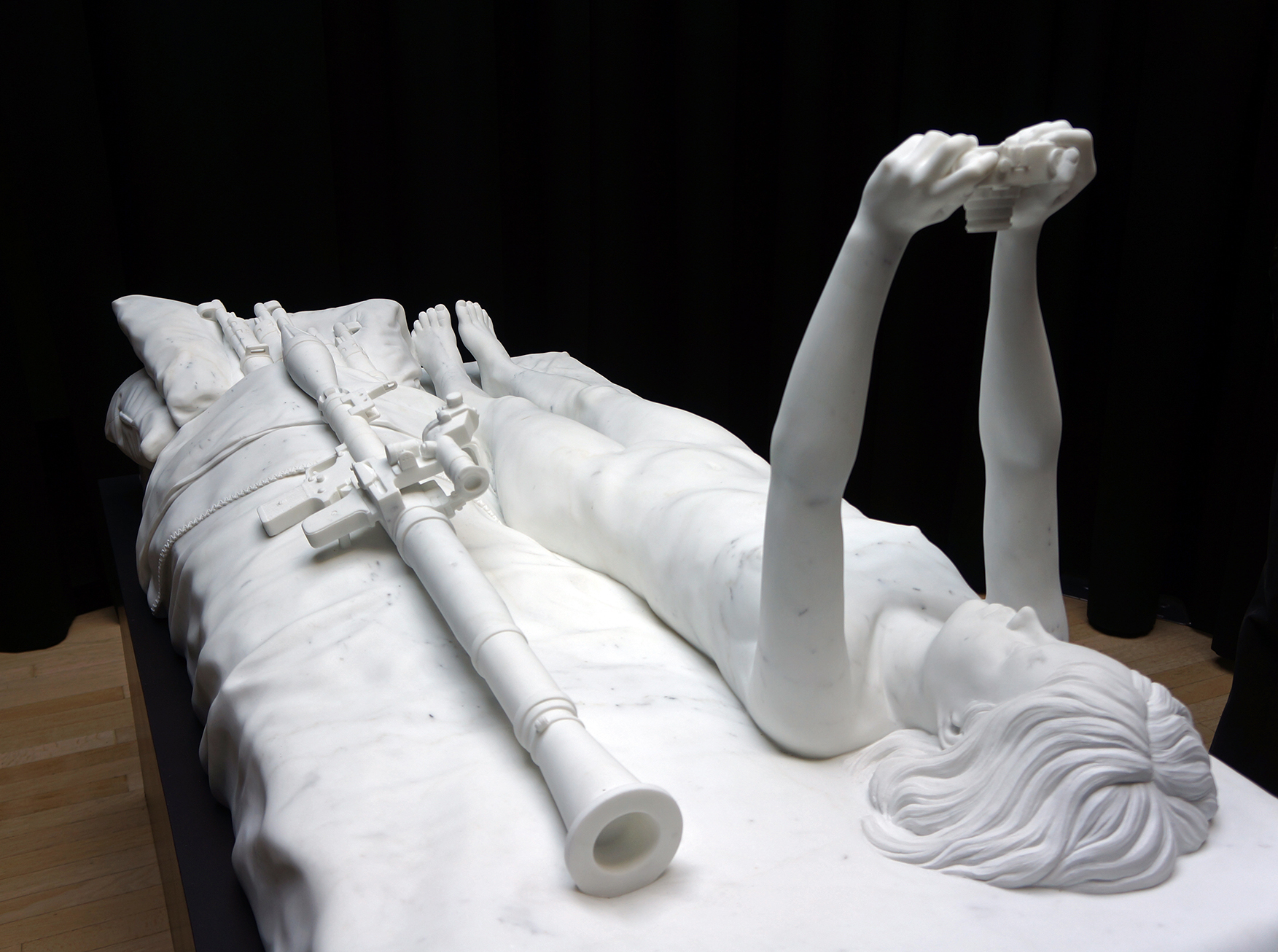
Figure on bed with Camera and Weapons (2013) by Thom Puckey, statuario marble, carved from a single block. Dimensions - 206 x 104 x 77 cm

Thomas William (Thom) Puckey (Bexleyheath, England, 23 May 1948) is a British sculptor living in Amsterdam and Tuscany. He was awarded a master's degree in 1975 at the Royal College of Art, after studying fine art at Croydon College of Art. He moved to the Netherlands in 1979.

In 1990 he had a solo exhibition at the Stedelijk Museum Amsterdam, where several of his works are in the permanent collection. He has shown his work in solo exhibitions at various well-known galleries and museums in the Netherlands, Belgium, Germany, and Italy.

He has taught art at several art academies in the Netherlands, including the Rijksakademie van beeldende kunsten (1987 -1995) as a sculpture tutor, and AKV St. Joost (1997 - 2013) as a fine art tutor. In recent years, he has been a guest professor at various art academies and universities in China. His works are included in numerous international private and museum collections, and commissioned public sculptures are prominent in several cities in the Netherlands. In 2017 he completed a monument to Johan Rudolph Thorbecke, placed opposite the parliament buildings in The Hague.

In 2013 he designed a 5 euro commemorative coin in the Netherlands with the Peace Palace as subject.

In 1986 Puckey was awarded the Sandberg Prize (Netherlands) for Fine Art by the city of Amsterdam.

== Artistic career ==
=== Performance ===
From 1972-1980 Puckey worked as a performance artist, forming the duo "Reindeer Werk" together with Dirk Larsen. Reindeer werk worked, performed and exhibited throughout Europe and North America, and participated in Documenta VI in 1977. Another of their highlights was their five days and nights long project 'A Prediction' at De Appel in Amsterdam (1978).

=== Sculpture ===
Since 1983 he has worked as a sculptor, first with optical/abstract sculptures. Later his sculptures became increasingly more figurative, his recent bronze and particularly marble sculptures strongly referring to 19th-century Realism. The models for these laborious works have always been specific people, and traditional methods of casting, carving, and finishing were used in their production.

The realistically modeled or carved female nudes, precisely executed down to the most intimate detail, in striking poses with weapons, are depicted on everyday objects such as mattresses, pillows and furniture. The contrast between the nudity referring to classical antiquity, and the brutal-looking contemporary military technology collapses classical studio techniques with art-historical legacies and contemporary political implications.

=== Analogue photography ===
Since 2016 Puckey has been concentrating more on black-and-white analogue photography, working solely in his own darkroom and studio and shooting, developing, and printing the photographs himself. The images are initially composed with great precision but then often thrown open to chance, using long shutter speeds and mobile lights or a mobile camera. In his complex and strange photographs, light, time and spatiality often seem to achieve an importance equal to the portrayed scene or subject.

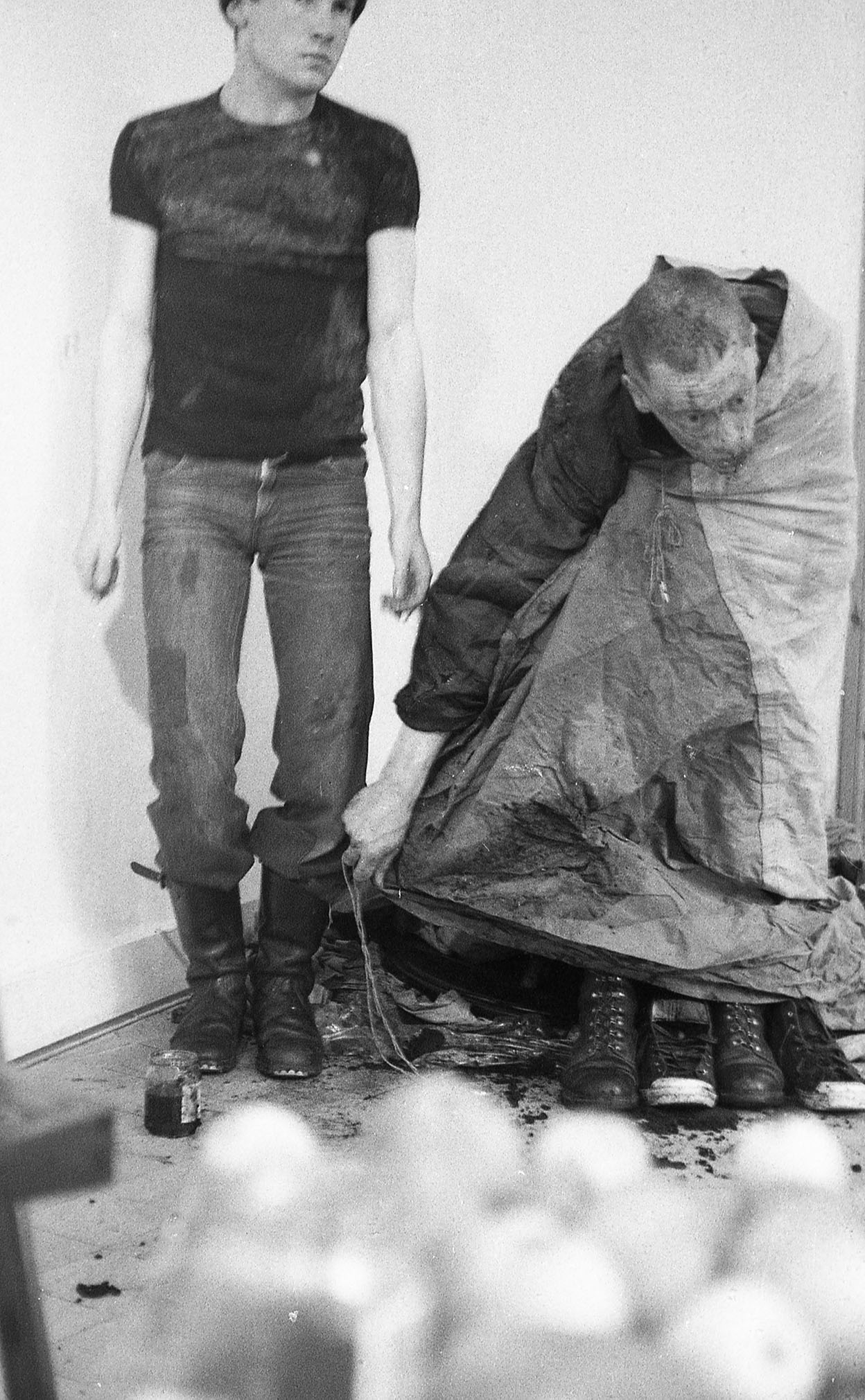
Reindeer Werk in performance (1975) Thom Puckey and Dirk Larsen. Galerie St. Petri, Lund, Sweden. Photographer - Angela Spanswick

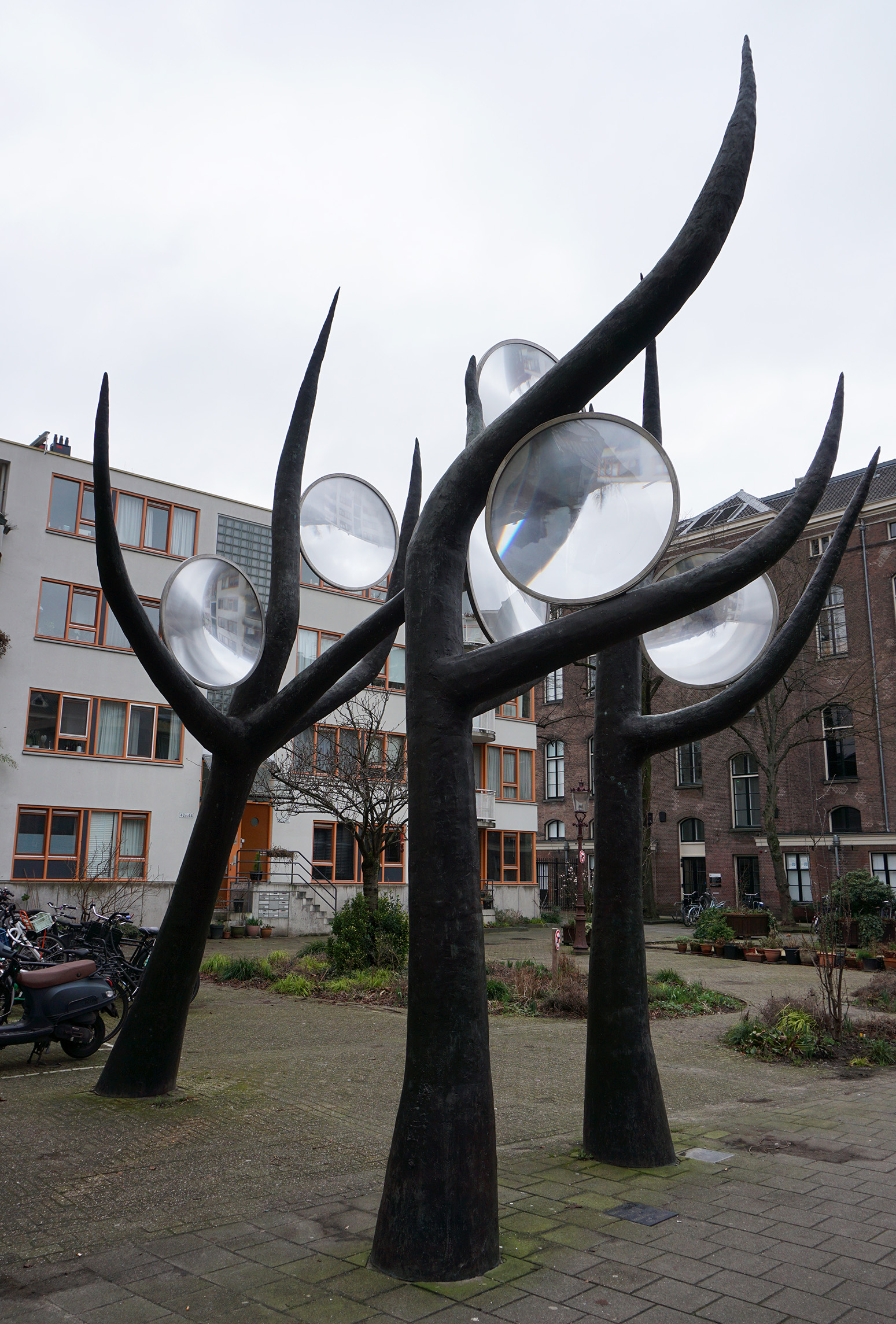
The Lens Trees (1989) Thom Puckey. Binnengasthuisplein, Amsterdam

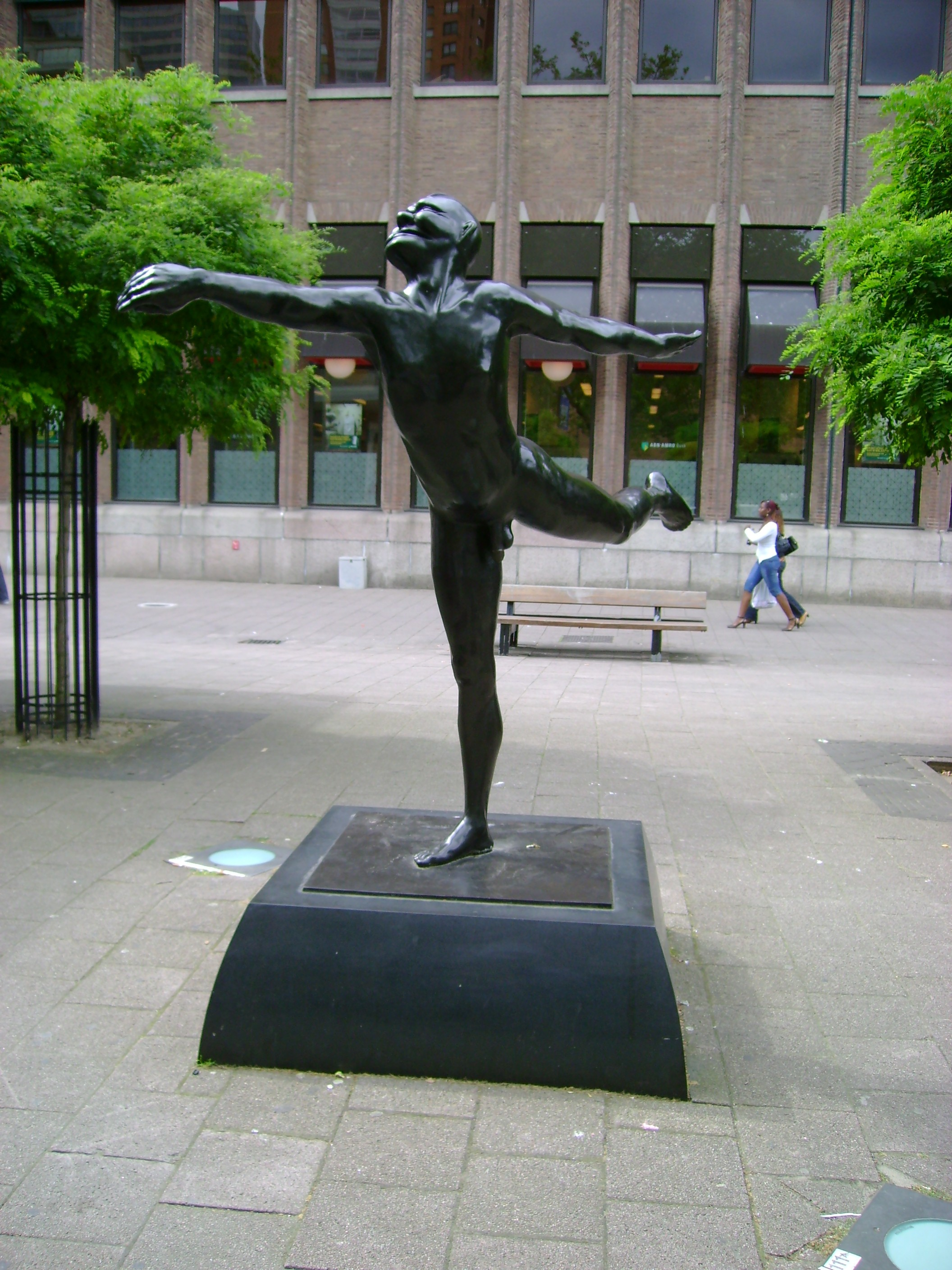
The husband of the Doll (1991) Thom Puckey. International Sculpture Collection

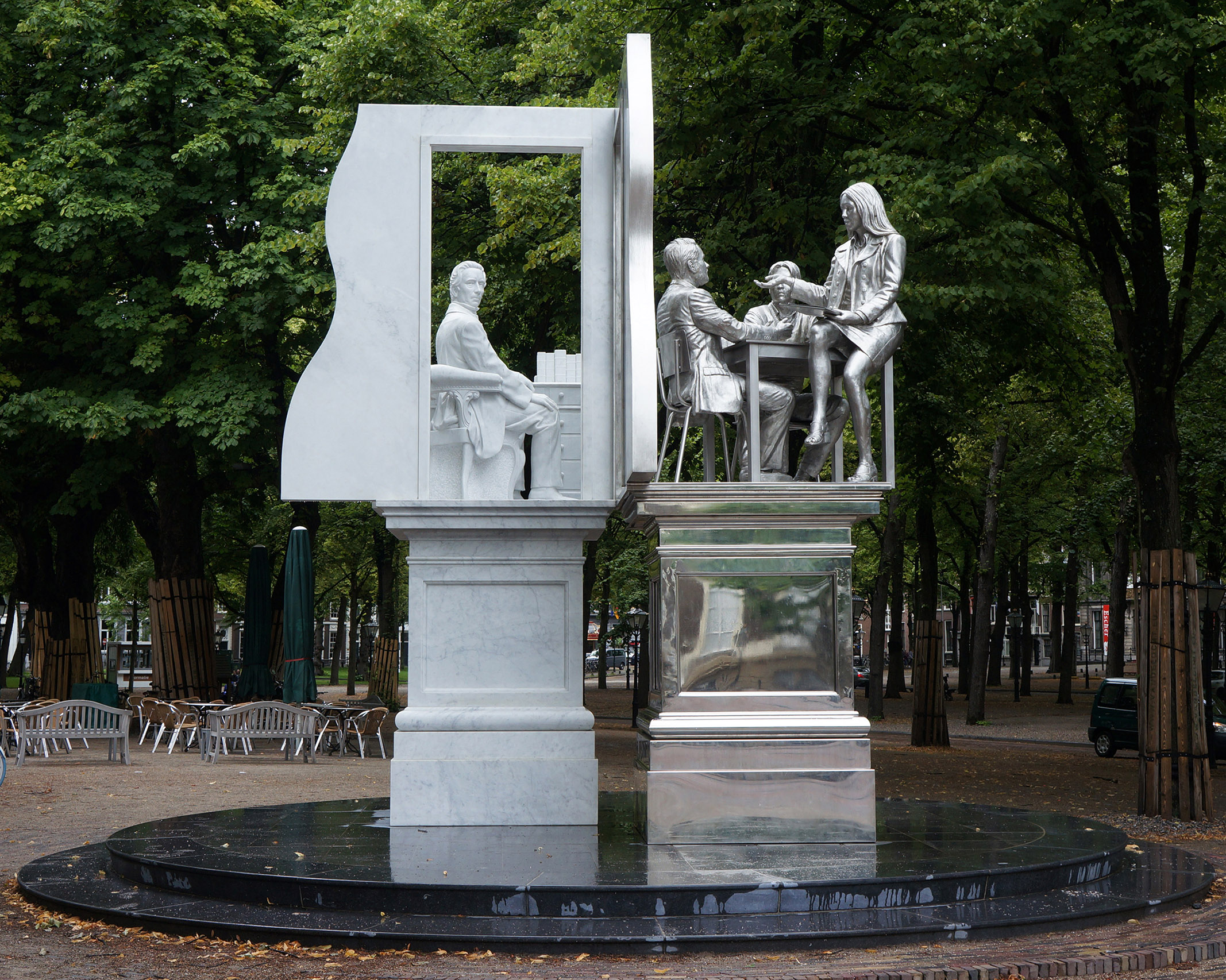
Monument for J.W. Thorbecke (2017) Thom Puckey. Carrara marble and Stainless Steel. Tornooiveld, Den Haag. Commissioned by the City of The Hague

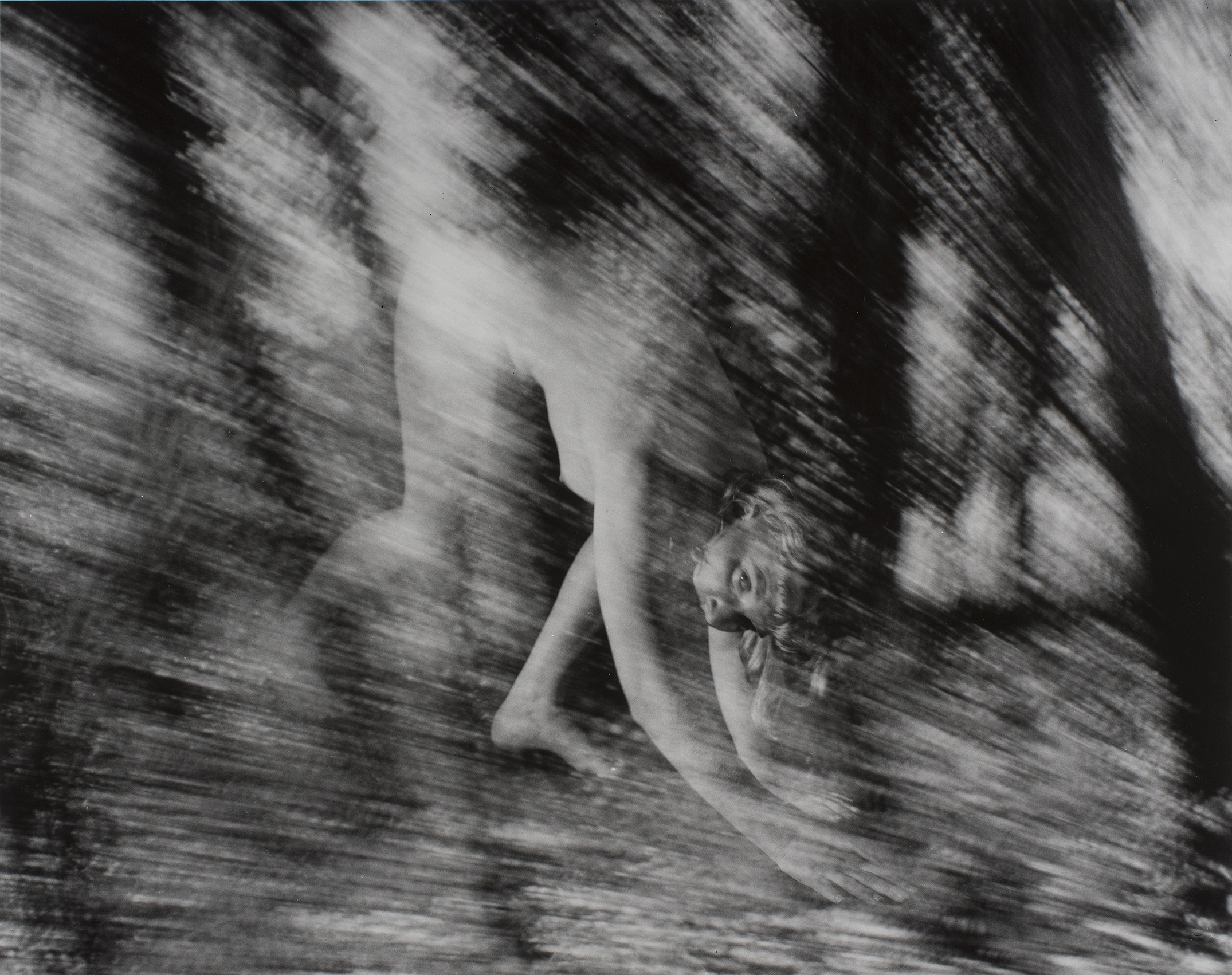
Maenad (2023) Thom Puckey. Analog print from single negative - gelatin silver photo paper 48 x 38,4 cm
