= Sandberg Prize (Netherlands) =

The Sandberg Price was a prize for the visual arts, which was awarded annually between 1985 and 2002 by the Amsterdam Fund for the Arts. The prize is named after Willem Sandberg, a graphic designer and former director of the Stedelijk Museum.

Since 2003 the Sandberg Price was abolished and incorporated into the new Amsterdam Prize.

== Winners ==
- 1985: Toon Verhoef
- 1986: Thom Puckey
- 1987: Stanley Brouwn
- 1988: René Daniëls
- 1989: Marlene Dumas
- 1990: Kees Smits
- 1991: Adam Colton
- 1992: Pieter Holstein
- 1993: Philip Akkerman
- 1994: Jos Kruit
- 1995: Moniek Toebosch
- 1996: Ritsaert ten Cate
- 1997: Aernout Mik
- 1998: Jan Roeland
- 1999: Rob Birza
- 2000: Job Koelewijn
- 2001: Helen Frik
- 2002: Roy Villevoye

== See also ==
- List of European art awards
