= Peter Klashorst =

Dutch painter and photographer (1957–2024)

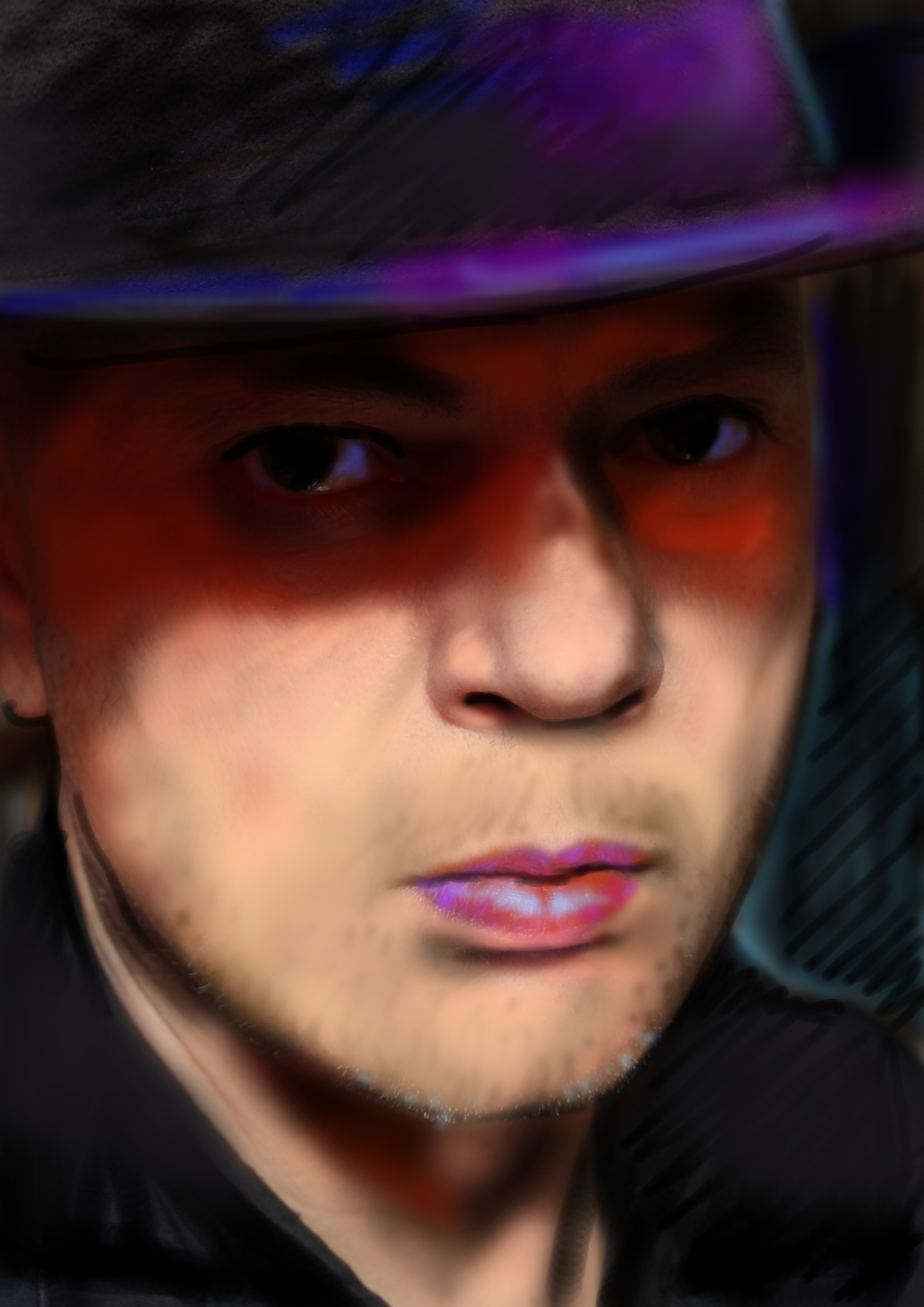
- Klashorst in a self-portrait
- Born: Peter van de Klashorst; 11 February 1957; Santpoort, Netherlands
- Died: 11 September 2024 (aged 67); Amsterdam, Netherlands
- Education: Gerrit Rietveld Academie

Peter Klashorst (born Peter van de Klashorst, pronounced [ˈpeːtər vɑn də ˈklɑsɦɔrst]; 11 February 1957 – 11 September 2024) was a Dutch painter, sculptor, and photographer.

== Biography ==
Klashorst was based in the Tabakspanden on the Spuistraat in Amsterdam, although he also produced works in cities such as Bangkok, Mombasa, and Phnom Penh.

In 2011 he did one of his last self organised shows at the Tuol Sleng, S21 the former Khmer Rouge prison (Cambodia), in honour of the victims of the Khmer Rouge’s terror and genocide that took place from 1975 to 1979 in Cambodia. Klashorst created a set of around 50 paintings. The show got worldwide attention (The New York Times and Herald Tribune).

Klashorst died of lymphoma in Amsterdam, on 11 September 2024, at the age of 67; at the time of his death he had been suffering from HIV for several years.

== Prizes ==
- 1982 Johan en Titia Buning-Brongers Prize
- 1983 Royal Prize for Free Painting (Netherlands)

== Work by Peter Klashorst ==
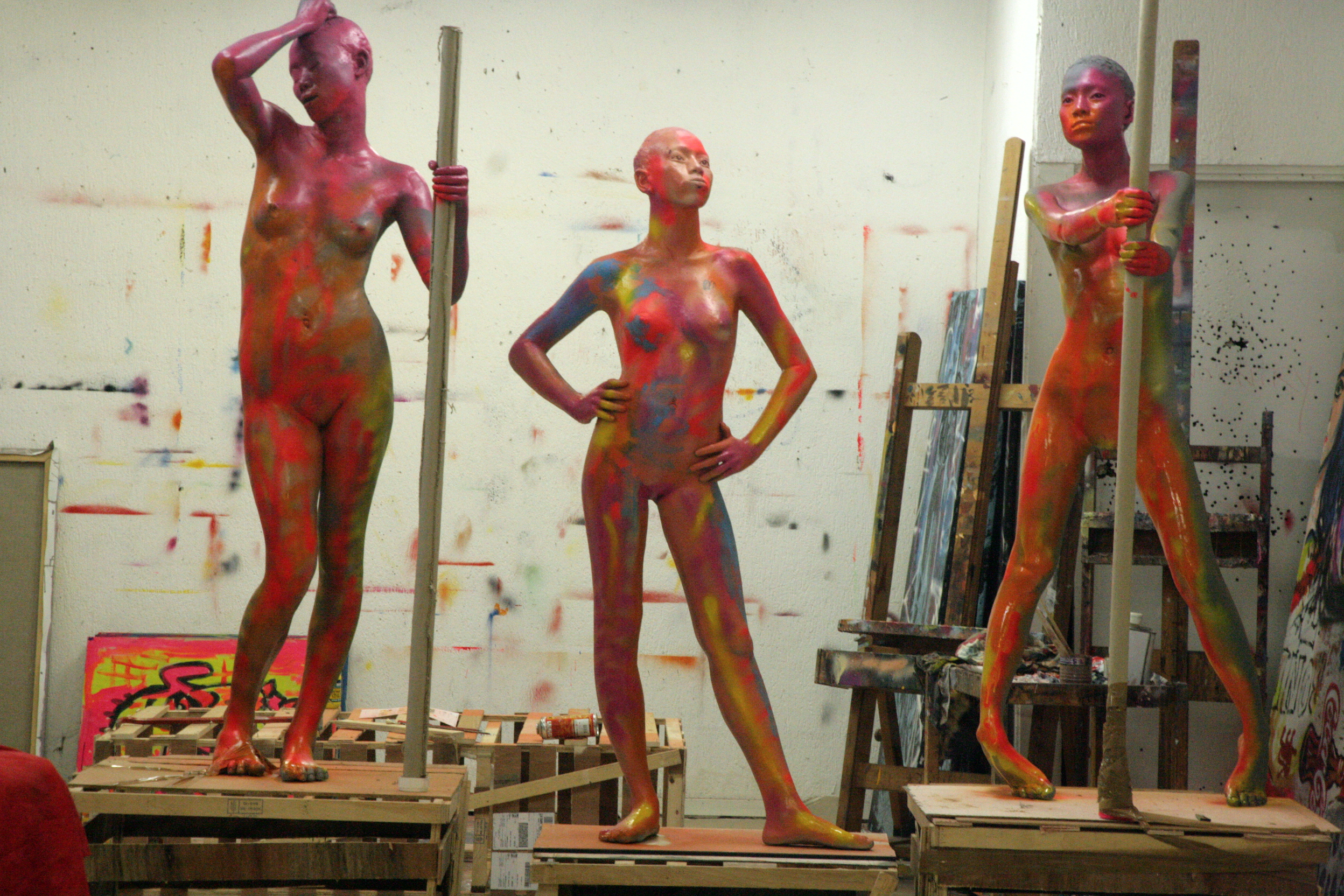
Heaven above

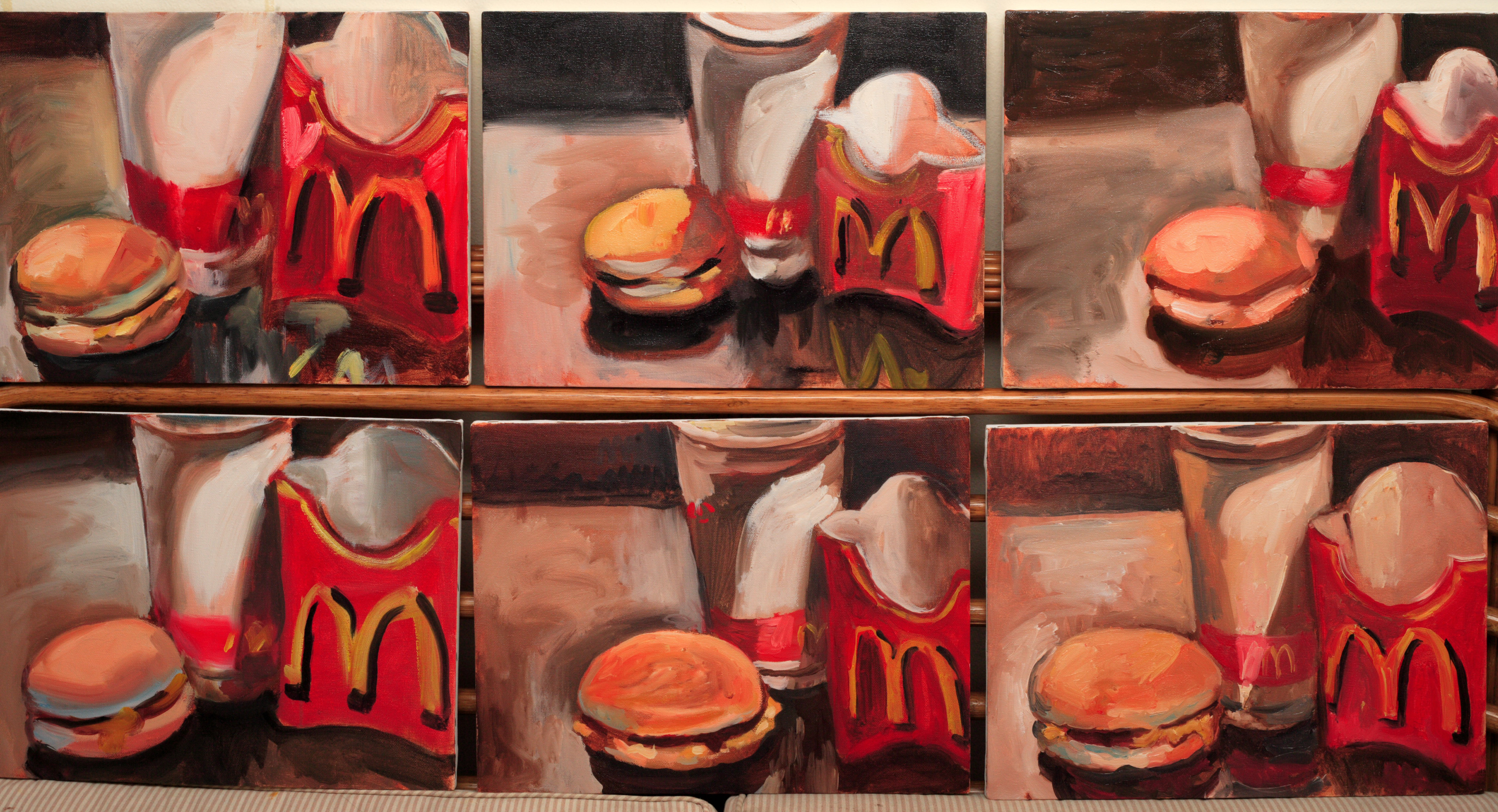
Find the differences

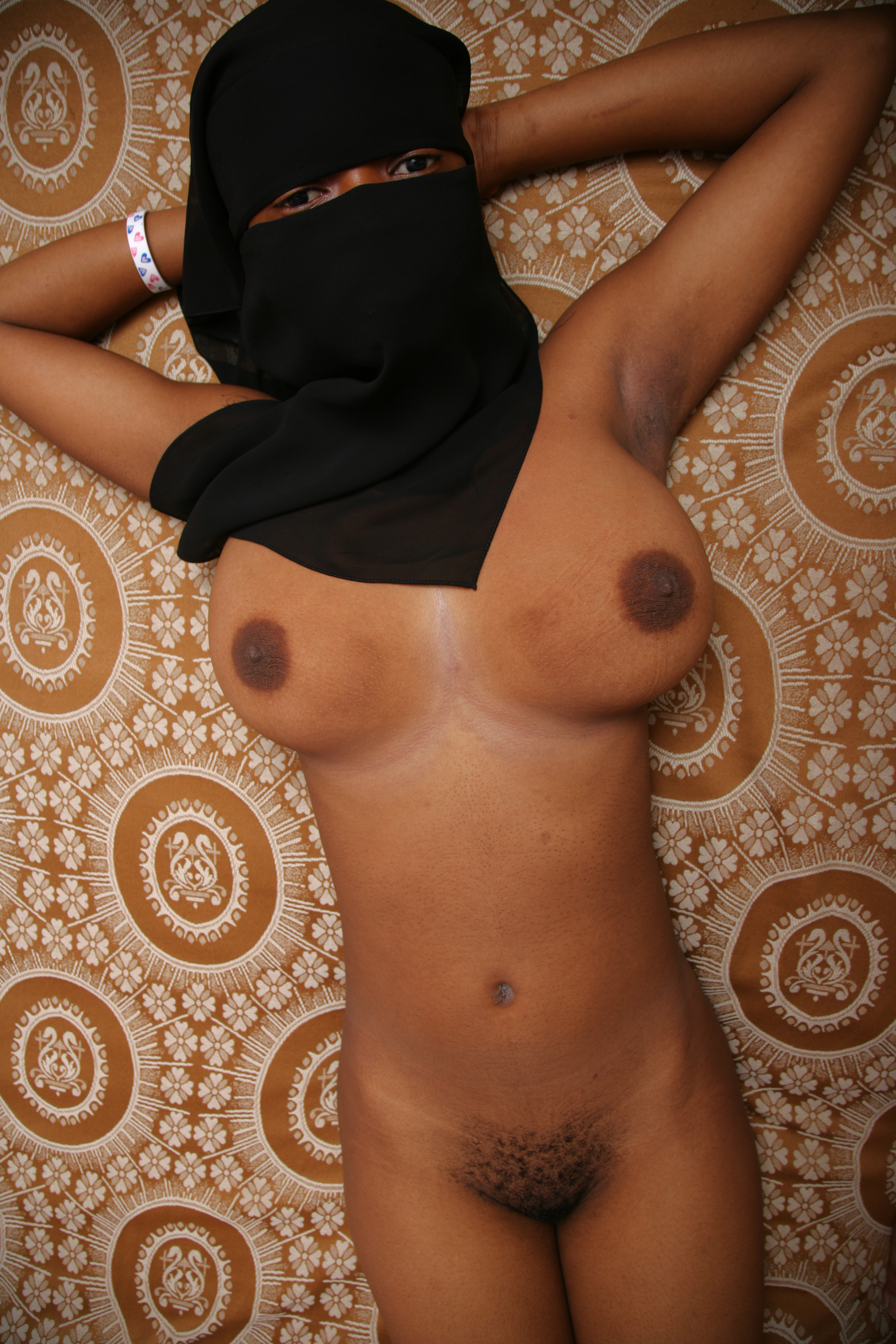
Gesluierd

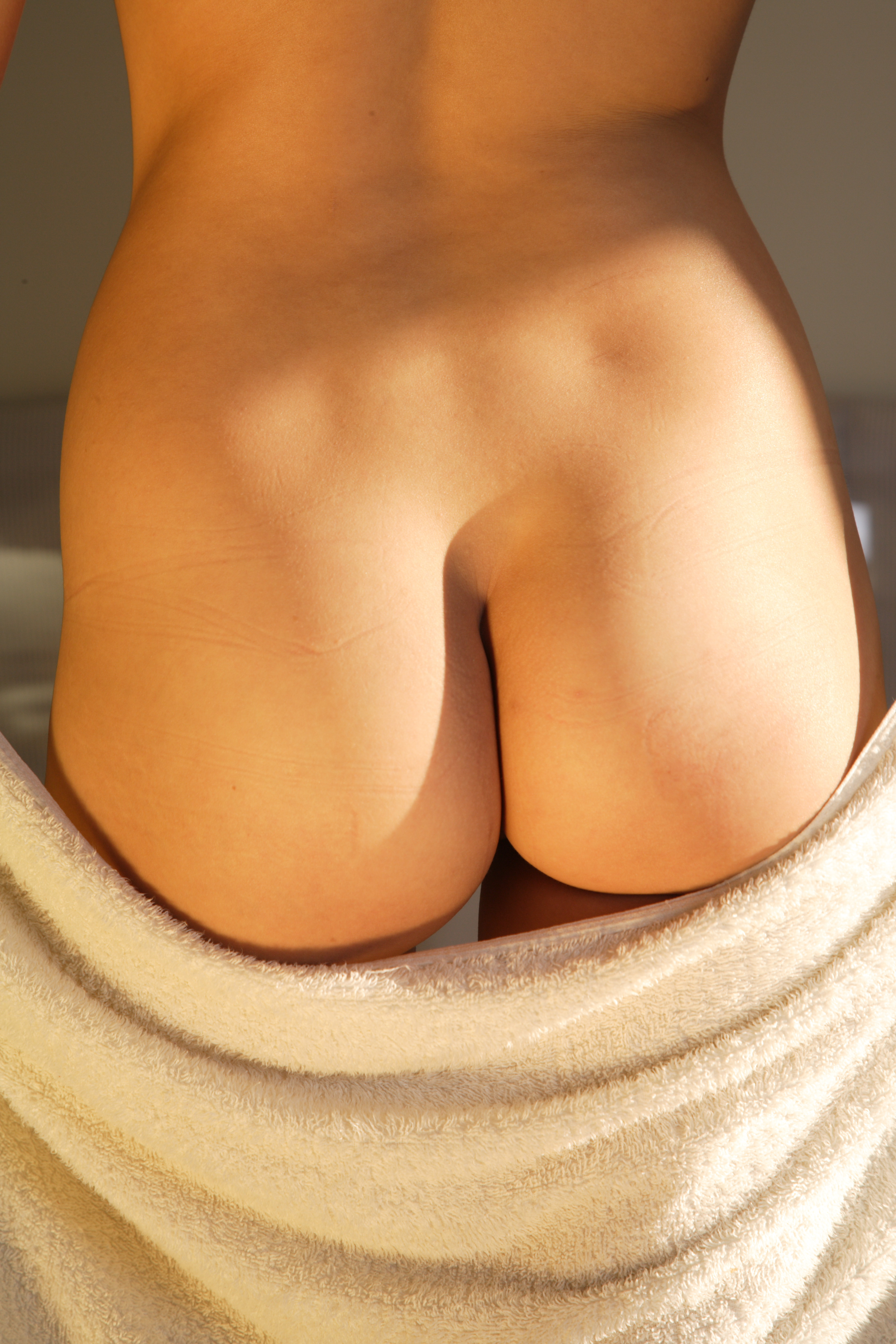
Delicious female buttocks

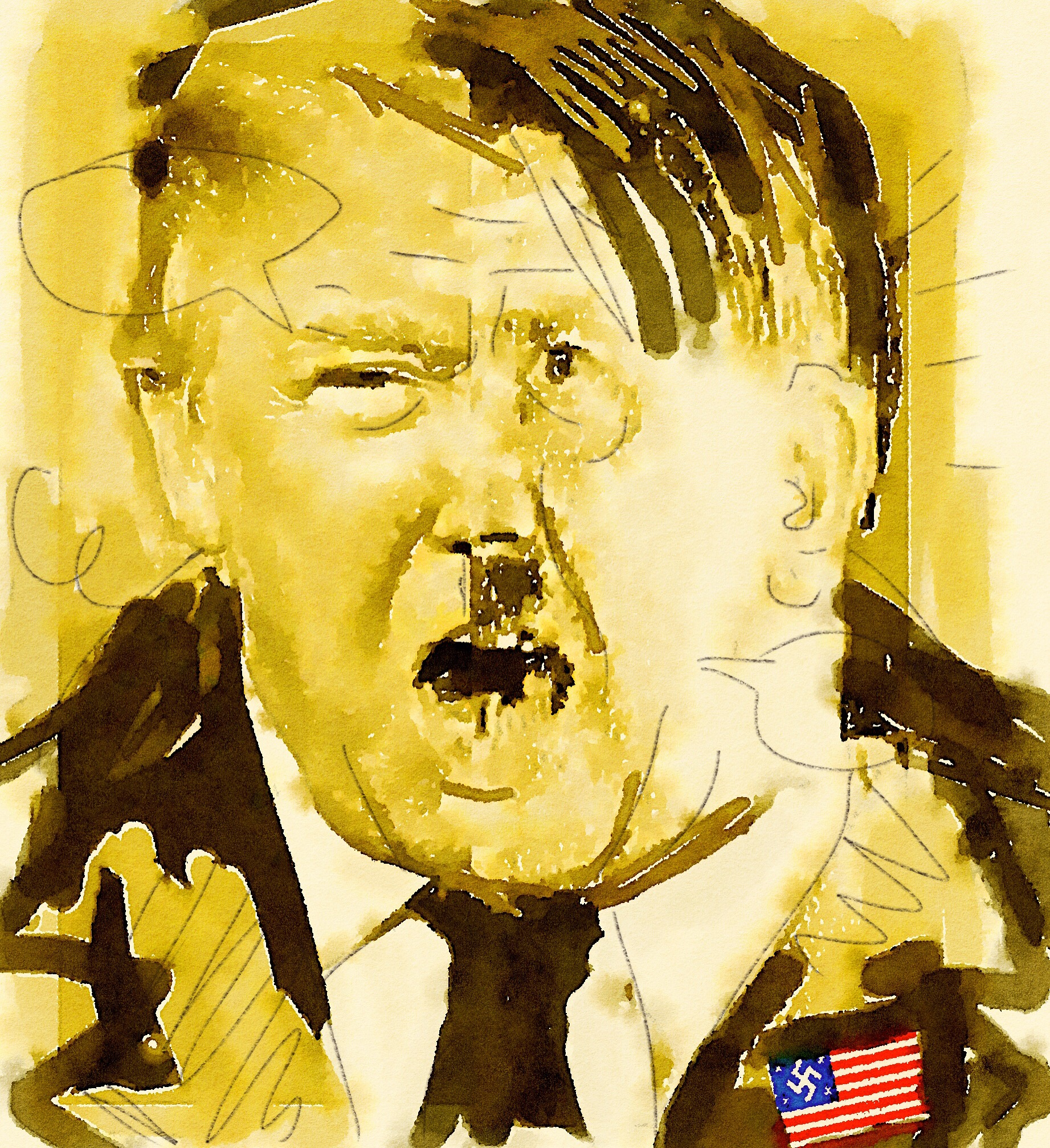
Double face, Donald Trump and Adolf Hitler

== Bibliography ==
- (in Dutch) Steef Davidson, red., Peter Klashorst, tekeningen: Poëzie explosie : 23-5, 30-5, 6-6 1979, Amsterdam, 1979
- (in Dutch) Peter Klashorst; samenst. Timo van der Eng, Theo van der Hoeven; red.: Marleen Buddemeijer: Schilderen met acryl, Utrecht, 1997, ISBN 90-6533-435-1
- (in Dutch) Mieke Rijnders, Geurt Imanse: Over schilderkunst; Pieter Holstein, René Daniels, Peter Klashorst, 1983.
- (in Dutch) Paul Groot et al.: After nature, Amsterdam, 1989, catalogus uitgegeven ter gelegenheid van de tentoonstellingen van Bart Domburg, Jurriaan van Hall en Peter Klashorst in de galerieën Jurka, Hans Gieles en Torch te Amsterdam.
- (in Dutch) Robert Vuijsje: King Klashorst, Amsterdam, 2005, ISBN 90-5000-428-8
- (in Dutch) Peter Klashorst: Castles in the Air, Bangkok, 2010, ISBN 978-94-90956-01-1
- (in Dutch) Peter Klashorst: Kunstkannibaal, 2012, ISBN 978-90-44617917
