= Moniek Toebosch =

Dutch actress, artist and musician (1948–2012)

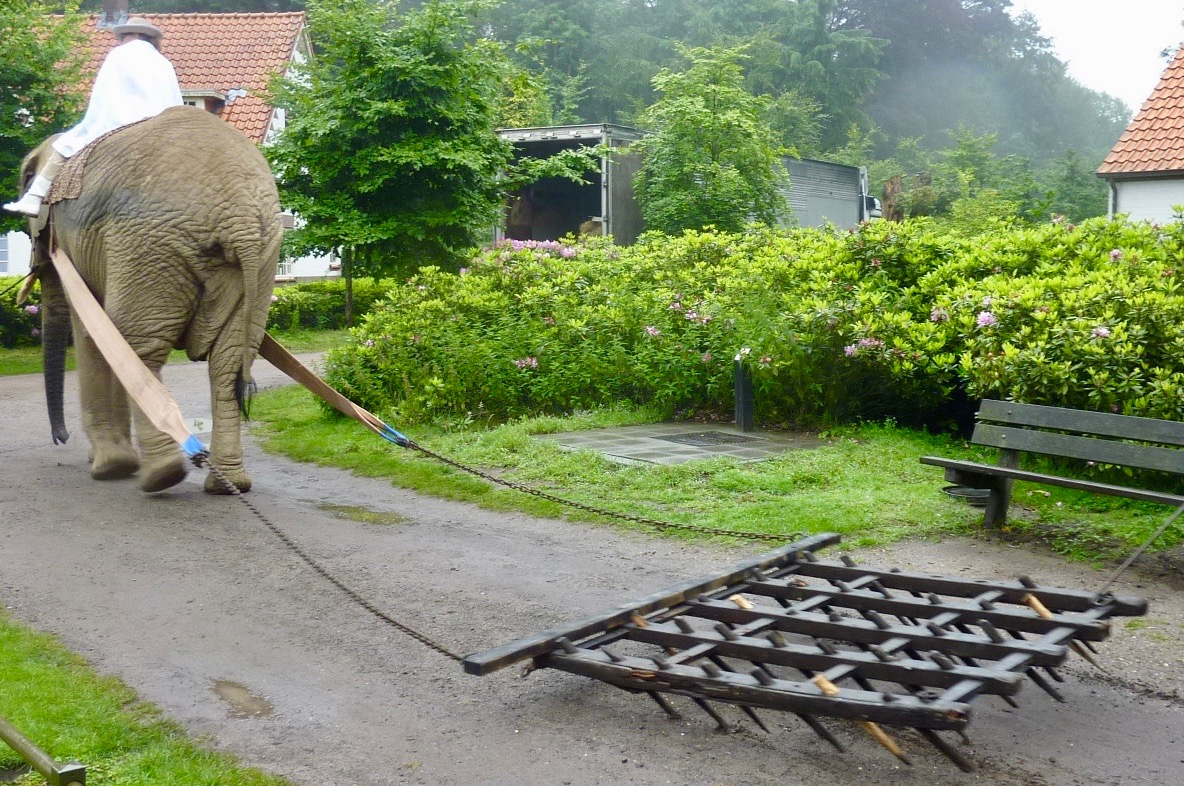
- Moniek Toebosch during her final performance: Erasing and Recovering on a Saturday Afternoon in June 2011.
- Born: Monique Pauline Maria Josephine Toebosch; 19 August 1948; Breda, Netherlands
- Died: 24 November 2012 (aged 64); Amsterdam, Netherlands
- Other name: Paul Rubens
- Education: Brabant Conservatory; AKV St. Joost
- Occupations: Actress; Artist; Musician
- Years active: 1967–2011
- Spouses: Cornelis Houwer (m. 1970; div. 1976) Rudolf Johannes Luijters (m. 1999; div. 2004)
- Awards: Sandberg Prize; Arti Medal of Arti et Amicitiae

Monique Pauline Maria Josephine Toebosch, also known by the pseudonym Paul Rubens, (19 August 1948 – 24 November 2012) was a Dutch actress, artist and musician. She began her performing career in 1969 and produced improvised music. Toebosch collaborated with Michel Waisvisz in multiple theatre productions and did solo productions before moving into the visual arts scene as an installation artist. She was a lecturer at the audiovisual department of Amsterdam's Gerrit Rietveld Academie; at ArtEZ University of Arts during the 1996–97 academic year; at the Rijksakademie van beeldende kunsten from 1996 to 2000 and was director of the post-academic course DasArts (later the Master of Theatre of the Amsterdam University of the Arts from 2004 to 2007. She was a recipient of the Sandberg Prize and the Arti Medal of Arti et Amicitiae.

== Early life ==
On 19 August 1948, Toebosch was born in Breda, the fourth of six children of the Dutch composer and organist Louis Toebosch and the Flemish woman Maria Adolphina Anna Rubens. She was raised in Breda and had failed to gain admittance to a drama school when she was 16 years old. Toebsoch went on to briefly study in the sculpture department of the Breda Art Academy in 1968 and dropped out halfway through her scheduled time at the Brabant Conservatory in Breda after a year's studying guitar and singing. From 1970 to 1975, she studied fashion, illustration and graphic design at AKV St. Joost, where she received more personal expression than at Brabant.

== Career ==
While at AKV St. Joost, Toebsoch performed French music in cafés and concert halls. She produced improvised music such as with the Werkgroep voor Vanzelfsprekendheid in 1969 and The New Electric Chamber Music Ensemble. From 1969, Toebosch acted in films such as Spare Bedroom, Eating, Seats Two, Spectator and Behind your Walls, which were directed by Frans Zwartjes. She collaborated with Michel Waisvisz from 1972 in theatre productions such as Kerstspel in 1972, Avond over Jazz in 1976, Michel de Kerstnacht door in 1977 and De M&M en M&M Show in 1979. She performed the role of the squatter boxer Waisvisz in the solo theatre production Ze zeggen dat ze zingt... based in Breda at the Shaffy Theater in 1978 and received gilders from the Ministry of Culture, Recreation and Social Work. Toebosch and Kees Klaver produced the solo theatre cinematic adaptive production of Ike Bertels broadcast on VPRO's NPO 2 channel in June 1979 in which she was the lead role.

Not long after, she began her visual arts career. In April 1980, Toebosch performed two solo performances under the title Ten Toonstelling len II in which she discussed current events, personal experiences and potential audience reactions. She reached a wider audience with the installation of the Painthouse, a 'composition of wood, linen, paint and mezzo-soprano', firstly presented at the Royal Theater Carré and broadcast by the VPRO on television, then shown at Stedelijk Museum Amsterdam the following year. Toebosch played a prostitute in the 1982 Orlow Seunke film The Taste of Water. In June 1983, she presented a series of four live VPRO art programmes of the series Aanvallen van uitersten from the Royal Theater Carré that was holding part of the Holland Festival. During one performance, she persuaded some musicians to continue performing after the conductor Iván Fischer forced the NOS Omroeporkest to stop playing, thinking the audience was not taking the music of Richard Wagner's Prelude seriously.

From 1985 to 1990, Toebosch worked as a lecturer at the audiovisual department of Amsterdam's Gerrit Rietveld Academie. She created a series six works of installation art under the title Les Douleurs Contemporaines and the 'Engelenzender' song on behalf of the Van Leeuw foundation in 1994. Engelenzender broadcast daily on the 24 hour radio station Engelen/Angels FM 98.0 for motorists driving on the Houtribdijk between 1994 and 2000 and gave her national attention. She was a guest lecturer at ArtEZ University of Arts during the 1996–97 academic year and was an educator at Rijksakademie van beeldende kunsten from 1996 to 2000. Toebosch was a member of the Council for Culture until 1997. In 2002, she established the internet-only political party called the Ideal Party after becoming unhappy with the political atmosphere, and campaigned for an artist-specific bank. Toebosch served as director of the post-academic course DasArts (later the Master of Theatre of the Amsterdam University of the Arts from 2004 to 2007. She invited students from around the world to attend the institution to develop themselves.

She took on the male alter ego Paul Rubens in 2010, which she based on her mother's maiden name after a diagnosis of lung cancer and performed in the character on occasion. Toebosch had a role in the 2010 film De Strijkrol and in Fiona Tan's Levensloop before ending her career in the outdoor exhibition Erasing and Recovering on a Saturday Afternoon held in Tilburg in June 2011. She was dressed in white and rode on the back of an elephant pulling an harrow for two hours. Her works were exhibited in several museums and exhibition spaces such as in the Brouwerij De Beyerd in Breda, de Appel, the Stedelijk Museum in Amsterdam, Witte de With in Rotterdam, the Fundació Joan Miró in Barcelona and the Le Fresnoy Art Center in Lille.

== Personal life ==
She was married twice; firstly to the mechanical engineer Cornelis Houwer from 11 June 1970 to 29 December 1976 and to the artist Rudolf Johannes Luijters between 14 December 1999 and 28 December 2004. There were no children of the two marriages. Although Toebosch did not smoke, she was diagnosed with lung cancer in March 2008 and was given three months to live. She chose to undergo euthanasia and died on 24 November 2012 in Amsterdam.

== Reputation ==
Rudy Koopmans described her as "the only (fake) diva of Western European improvised music" in the De Volkskrant newspaper in 1977. He noted that Toebosch had a "face is very flexible and she can open her mouth up to her ears. Even in a resting position, it is a formidable mouth." Author Thomas Dresscher wrote that she "was a versatile artist who liked to experiment and has guided and inspired many young artists. Art critics and historians find it difficult to name or categorize her diverse and eclectic work. It is in almost all cases groundbreaking and confrontational."

She received the Sandberg Prize in 1995, the Fonds BKVB Visual Arts Award in 2000 and the Arti Medal of Arti et Amicitiae in 2009.
