= Aernout Mik =

Dutch artist

- Born: July 3, 1962 (age 64); Groningen, the Netherlands
- Education: De Ateliers; Academie Minerva
- Known for: Installation; film
- Notable work: Dutch Pavilion at the 52nd Venice Biennale

Aernout Mik (born July 3, 1962) is a Dutch artist known for his installations and films. He teaches at the Kunstakademie Münster in Germany.

== Life and career ==
Mik spent his childhood in Groningen and studied there from 1983 to 1988 at the Academie Minerva. He also had lessons from Fie Werkman. He had his first solo exhibition in 2000 at the Van Abbemuseum in Eindhoven, titled Primal gestures, minor roles.

In 1997, Mik received the Sandberg Prize for his videos Lick (1996) and Fluff (1996). In 2002, he received the Dr A. H. Heineken Prize for Art.

In 1997, Mik, along with designer William Oorebeek, participated in the Dutch pavilion in the Venice Biennale. In 2001, he took part in Post-Nature, an exhibition of Dutch art which took place in the 49th Venice Biennale. Mik was again selected in 2007 to take part in the Venice Biennale for the Netherlands.

His work Organic Escalator (2000) is housed in the Pinault Collection and was presented in 2007 in Lille in the exhibition Passage du temps.

The memory of places and history are highlighted in his work. Communitas is his first film, created in Poland. A performance was staged in the interior of the Palace of Culture and Science during the summer of 2010. The film premiered at the Dramatic Theatre in Warsaw and at the São Paulo Art Biennial the same year. In this hour-long film, a crowd is trapped inside the Palace of Culture and Science. People of different ages and nationalities occupy the theater, the corridors, and the conference rooms. In her doctoral thesis, Kate Wyrembelska develops her concept of "creative documentation" by analysing Mik's work in Warsaw; Communitas for her represents the endurance of the political act.
