= Marko Branica =

Croatian chemist

Marko Branica (1931, Zagreb - 2004, Zagreb) was a Croatian chemist known for his investigations of electrochemical methods for the environmental analysis. For his research he was awarded the Heineken Prize for Environmental Sciences.

From 1952 to 1956 Branica studied chemistry in Zagreb. In 1963 he obtained his PhD from the Faculty of Science, University of Zagreb. In 1970 he became a senior scientist at the Ruđer Bošković Institute and in 1997 a full professor at the Faculty of Science, University of Zagreb. He was an expert of the International Atomic Energy Agency for nuclear materials and nuclear plants safety problems and an expert of UNESCO. Between 1970 and 1995 he was several times a chairman of the Marine Chemistry Committee of the Mediterranean Science Commission and in 1992 became Croatia's national delegate on CIESM Board, a post he held till the end of his life.

His scientific interests were polarography and other electrochemical methods, physical chemistry of seawater, oceanography, ecology, extraction of inorganic substances with organic solvents and investigation of the presence of trace metals in natural and polluted waters. His most prominent achievement was the development of pseudopolarography, the method that enables the speciation of metal ions at trace concentrations. He published more than 250 papers in international scientific journals and numerous scientific and technical reports.

== Honors and awards ==
- Member of Polarographic Society of London
- Member of Academia Europaea (London) since 1992
- Member of European Academy of Sciences and Arts since 1992
- Member of International Commission for the Exploration of the Mediterranean
- Ruđer Bošković award for science in 1982
- Dr A.H. Heineken Prize for Environmental Sciences in 1992
- National Life achievement Award for chemistry in 1996
