= Shūsaku =

- Gender: Male

Origin
- Origin: Japanese
- Meaning: Different meanings depending on the kanji used

Shūsaku, Shusaku or Shuusaku is a masculine Japanese given name. Notable people with the name include:

- Chiba Shusaku Narimasa (千葉 周作 成政; 1793–1856), Japanese swordsman
- Honinbo Shusaku (本因坊 秀策; 1829–1862), Japanese professional Go player
- Shusaku Arakawa (荒川 修作; 1936–2010), Japanese artist and architect
- Shūsaku Endō (遠藤 周作; 1923–1996), Japanese author
- Shusaku Hirasawa (平沢 周策; born 1949), Japanese footballer
- Shusaku Nishikawa (西川 周作; born 1986), Japanese footballer
- Shusaku Sugiuchi (杉内 周作), Japanese Paralympic swimmer
- Shusaku Tokita (鴇田 周作; born 1990), Japanese footballer
