= RAAAF =

Dutch multidisciplinary artist studio

RAAAF is an experimental studio operating at the crossroads of visual art, architecture, and academic philosophy. The studio is based in Amsterdam and was founded in 2006 by Prix de Rome (Netherlands) laureate Ronald Rietveld and philosopher Erik Rietveld.

== Art practice ==
RAAAF creates artworks through research with visual artists, architects, academic researchers, and craftsmen. Artworks by RAAAF often relate to practices and policies that are connected with contemporary working and living environments. One example is the art installation Vacant NL that served as the Dutch contribution to the Venice Biennale in 2010. This work emphasized the possible uses of thousands of vacant buildings owned by the Dutch state.

Many projects by RAAAF include large spatial interventions at cultural heritage sites. For example, one intervention was to cut through Bunker 599, a monumental military bunker that was once part of the New Dutch Waterline. This intervention questioned Dutch and UNESCO policies on historical preservation, which the artists deemed too conservative. In 2021 the bunker that was now sliced in half became itself listed as a UNESCO World Heritage site. Another example is the spatial intervention that in 2018 transformed a Delta Works test facility into the artwork Deltawerk //. This work has been received both as a tribute to the Dutch struggle against the water and as questioning the viability of creating an indestructible Netherlands.

== Gallery ==
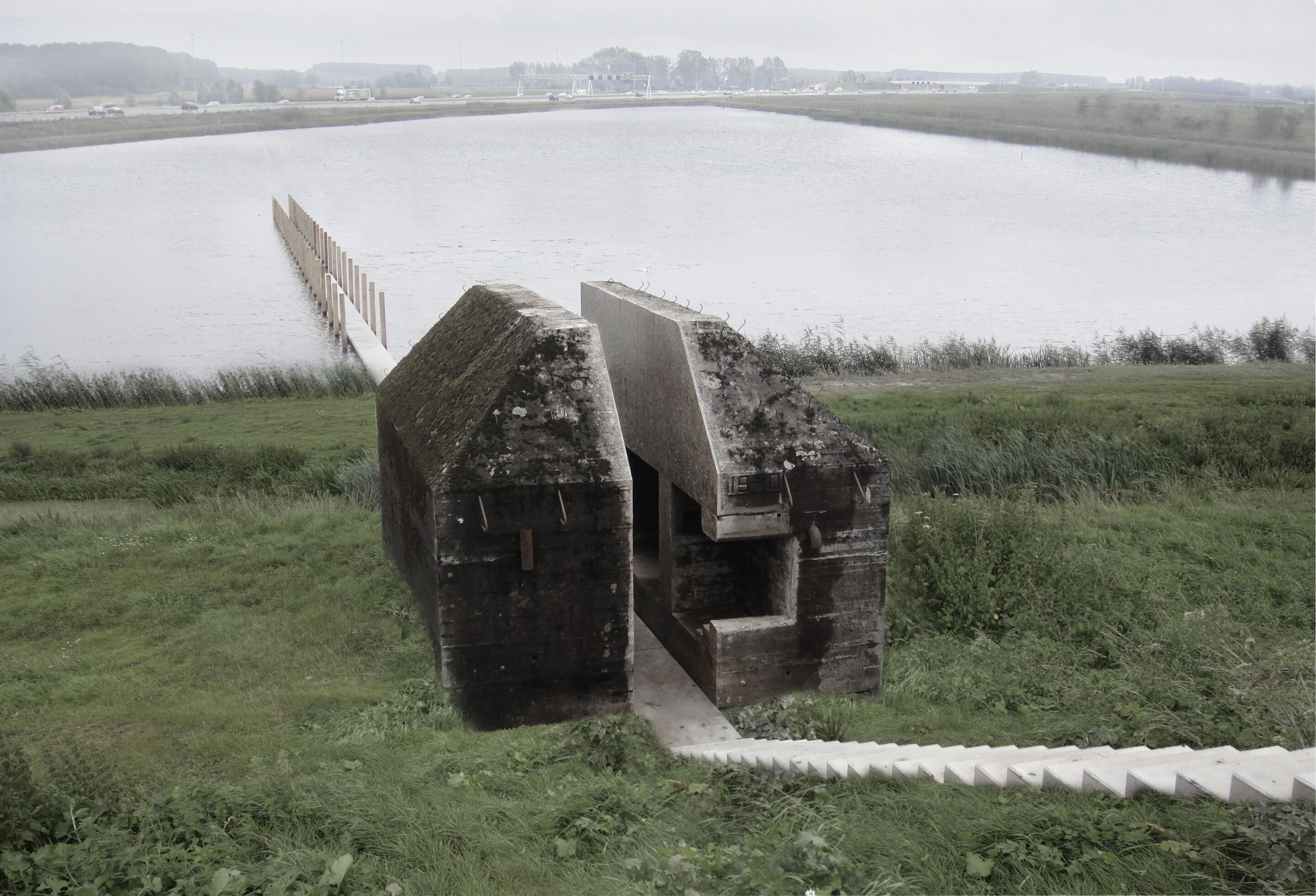
Bunker 599 - New Dutch Waterline, 2013, RAAAF I Atelier de Lyon

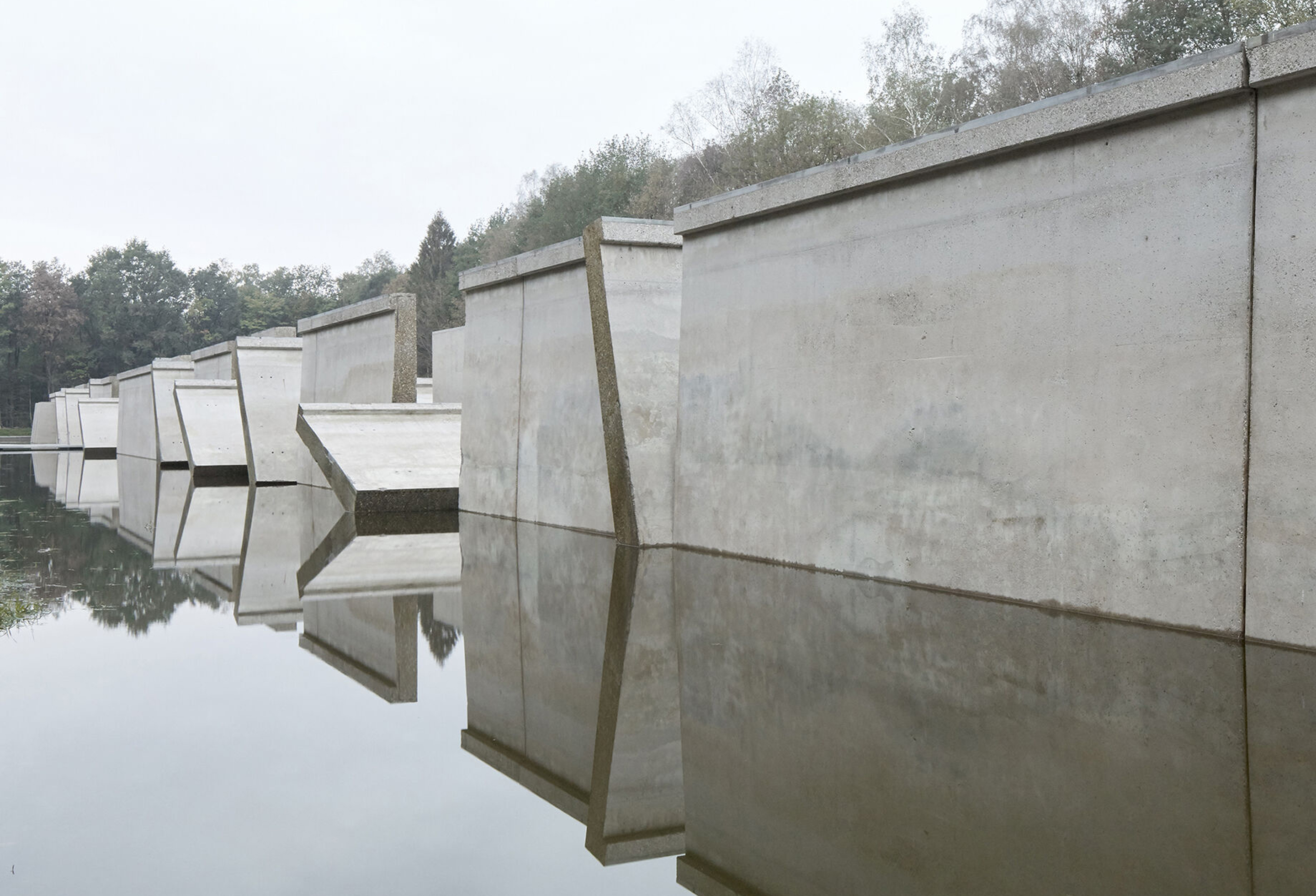
Deltawerk // - Land Art Flevoland collection, Waterloopbos, 2018, RAAAF I Atelier de Lyon

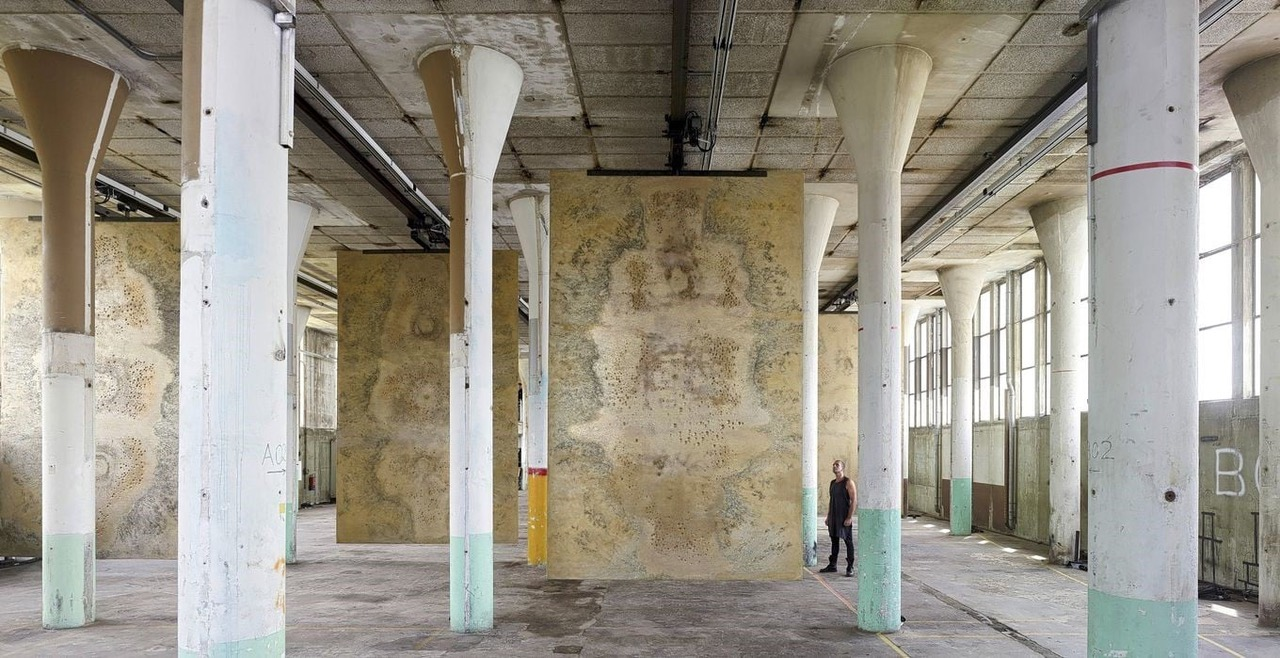
Still Life - Museum Het HEM, Amsterdam, 2019, RAAAF
