= Liza May Post =

Dutch artist

Liza May Post (born 1965) is a Dutch artist.

== Early life and education ==
Post was born in 1965 in the Netherlands. From 1988 to 1993 she studied at the Gerrit Rietveld Academie in Amsterdam. From 1994 to 1995 she did postgraduate studies at Rijksacademie, Amsterdam.

== Art career ==
Post represented the Netherlands in the 49th Venice Biennale in 2001.

Her work is included in the collections of the Walker Art Center, The Hague University of Applied Sciences, the Harn Museum of Art, and the Tate Museum.
