= Barbara Visser (artist) =

Dutch artist

Barbara Visser (born May 20, 1966 in Haarlem) is a Dutch artist, who works as conceptual artist, photographer, video artist, and performance artist.

== Biography ==
Visser studied at the Gerrit Rietveld Academy in Amsterdam from 1985 to 1991, and in this period at the Cooper Union University in New York in 1989, and later at the Jan van Eyck Academy in Maastricht in 1998.

After her graduation, she settled in Amsterdam as independent artist. Since 1998 Visser has exhibited her work at various exhibitions at home and abroad in solo and group exhibitions, most recently at the Baltic Centre for Contemporary Art in Gateshead (England). In 2006 Museum The Pavilions in Almere presented a retrospective her work. That year the monograph was published, entitled "Barbara Visser is not there" (Barbara Visser is er niet).

Work by Visser is present in museums, such as the Netherlands Stedelijk Museum Amsterdam, the Gemeentemuseum Den Haag in The Hague, the Museum of Modern Art Arnhem, the Frans Hals Museum in Haarlem, and the Museum Boijmans Van Beuningen in Rotterdam. In addition to her work at the Museum of Modern Art, Antwerp (Belgium) and the FRAC - Nord-Pas de Calais to Dunkirk (France).

Visser received the Charlotte Köhler Prize by the Prince Bernhard Culture Fund in 1996, and was granted the David Roell Price in 2007. She won the Young Belgian Painters Award in 1999, the Friedrich-Gildenwart Vordemberge Preis in 2000, and Dr A.H. Heineken Prize for Art in 2008.

== Work ==
In 1995 Visser was a guest at her own request in the Lithuanian television Gimines, where in four episodes she plays the artist by the name of Barbara Visser and wife of the Lithuanian-American surgeon Steve.

A 2001 article on Barbara Visser in the NRC Handelsblad, discloses that Visser not only seeks to introduce confusion, putting spectators on the wrong foot, but also nestles in the reality, switching back and forth between different realities to tamper with clichés and entrenched frames.

In 2006, TPG Post published a series of postage stamps with the theme 'Dutch' pictures'. Barbara Visser designed herein the stamp with a picture of one in Japan reconstructed Dutch windmill.

In 2023, Visser explored Dada artist Elsa von Freytag-Loringhoven's life and art, the question of Fountain's attribution, as well as broader themes of authenticity, imitation, and authorship in the film Alreadymade and a corresponding installation at Kunsthaus Zürich in 2024, curated by Simone Gehr.
