= Arte Laguna Prize =

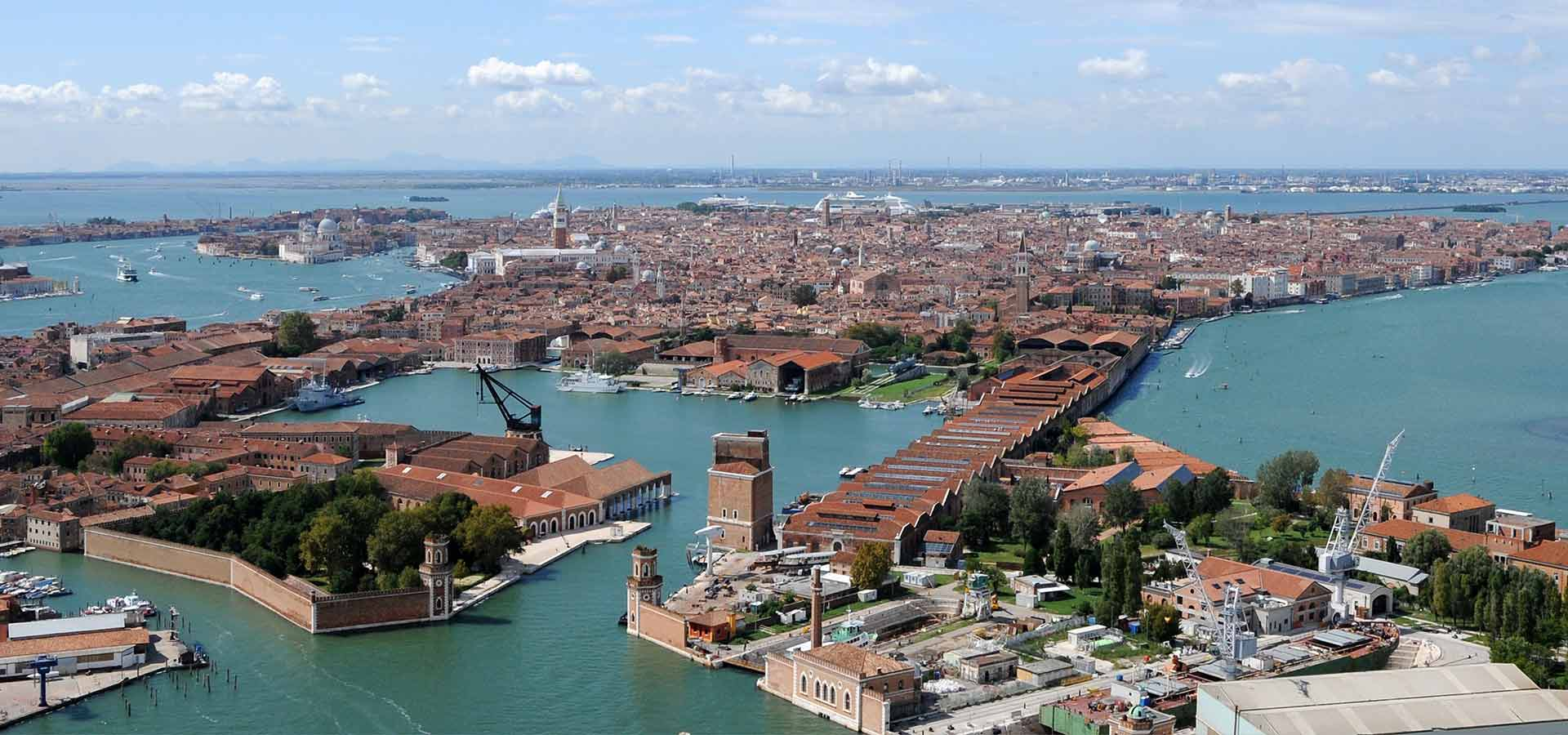
The Arsenale of Venice, home of Arte Laguna Prize

Arte Laguna Prize is an international art and design competition which takes place in Venice (Italy) since 2006 and aims to protect and enhance contemporary art. There are different contest sections: painting, sculpture and installation, photographic art, video art, performance, virtual art, digital graphics, land art, urban art and design. The competition is based in Venice, open to all, with free theme and no age restrictions. Its goal is to promote the artists and their careers through an array of opportunities.

== History ==
The competition was organized for the first time in 2006 by Italian Cultural association MoCA (Modern Contemporary Art) from an idea of the Arte Laguna studio. The jury is international and is composed of museums and foundations directors, independent curators and art critics. Every year, the finalists of the various sections show their works at the Arsenale of Venice and in the exhibition spaces of the TIM Future Centre, also in Venice.

During its long years of activity, Arte Laguna Prize has proven to be attentive to the most current instances in the art world and beyond. The same categories of works that can nowadays be proposed have evolved over time, following the most contemporary trends and always including new forms of expression. The award is currently open to the following artistic categories: Painting, Sculpture and Installation, Photographic Art, Video Art and Short Films, Performance, Digital Art, Digital Graphics and Cartoons, Land Art, Urban Art and Street Art, Art Design.

For the 2010 edition, the Arte Laguna Prize was awarded with the medal of the President of the Italian Republic Giorgio Napolitano as his "prize of representation".

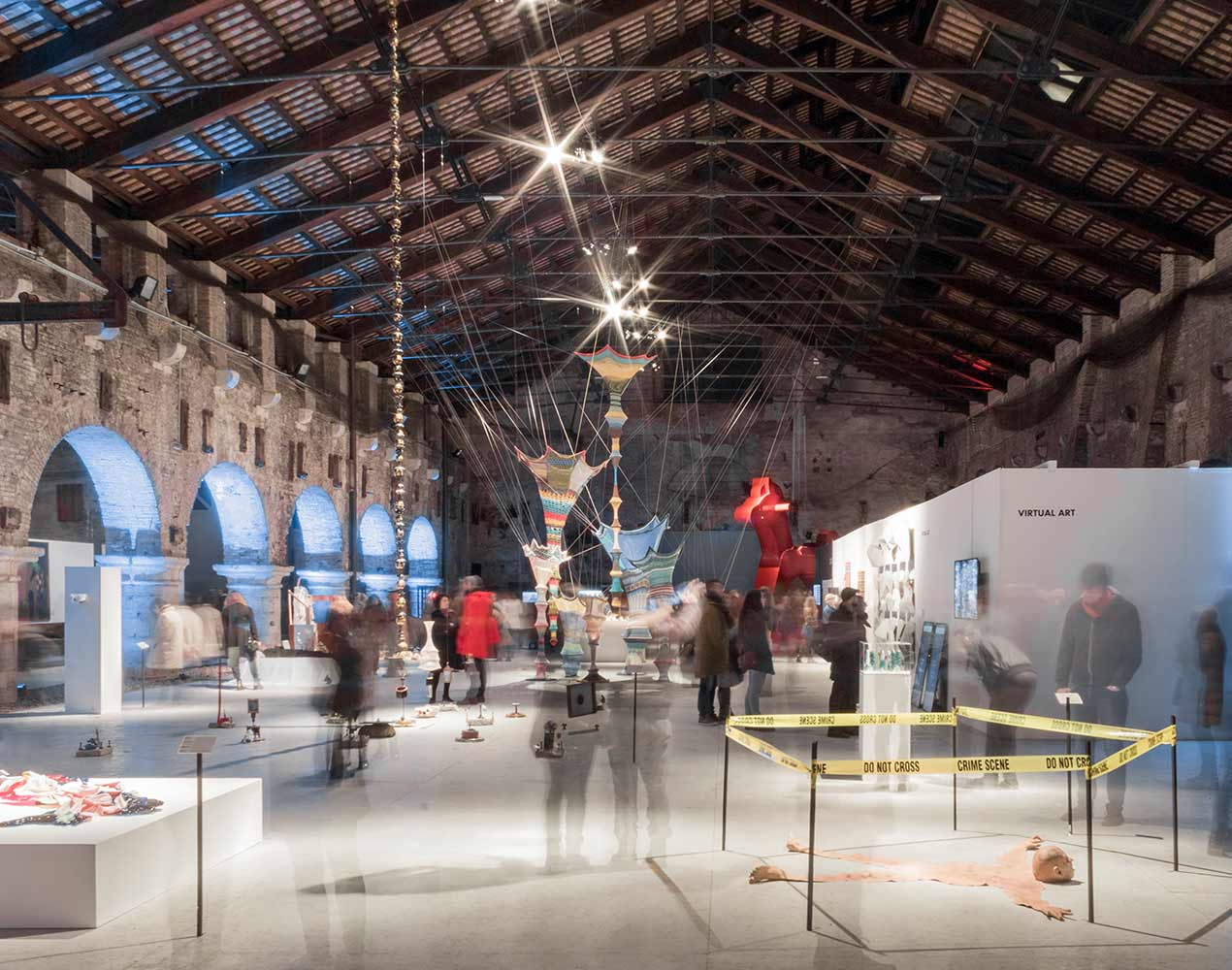
A past edition set-up at the Arsenale Nord in Venice

== Prizes ==
=== Institutional prizes ===
The competition provides a number of institutional prizes for the various sections:

- Painting Prize
- Sculpture and Installation & Virtual Art Prize
- Photographic Art & Digital Graphics Prize
- Video Art and Short Films & Performance Prize
- Land Art & Urban Art Prize

=== Special prizes ===
Special prizes include the realization of solo exhibitions in international galleries ("Artist in Gallery" Prizes), Art residencies for different periods in international locations, with the realization of on-site exhibitions and specific artworks ("Artist in Residence" Prizes). Over the various editions, other non-recurring special prizes were also awarded.

=== Other prizes ===
The "Business for art" Prizes are dedicated to artistic projects related to production of industrial or craft items. These prizes include the collaboration of artists with prestigious Made in Italy companies, and the implementation of product-specific projects.

Concerning the attention given to current issues of general interest, worthy of mention are those Special Prizes related to environmental matters such as the ‘Sustainability and Art’ prize, dedicated to works, products or artistic projects that emphasise RRR (Reuse, Reduce, Recycle) strategies and their positive impact on nature and the lives of citizens, and the BigCi environmental residency that takes place in Australia in Wollemi National Park.

Another collaboration was established with the online art platform Singulart during the 15th edition. As part of the collaboration, selected prize finalists were offered opportunities to showcase and sell their works on the platform. Winners included artists such as Victoria Yakusha, Elisa Bertaglia, and Paul Jeanteur.

== Editions ==
=== 2026 Edition ===
- Patronage: Ministry of Culture, Ministry of Tourism, Ministry of the Environment and Energy Security, Ministry of University and Research, Veneto Region, Metropolitan City of Venice, Municipality of Venice, Ca’ Foscari University of Venice, Città in Festa, Ascom Treviso/Confcommercio, with the contribution of the Venice Rovigo Chamber of Commerce.and recognition by important members of the Advisory Council;
- Prize Sections: Painting, Sculpture and Installation, Photographic Art, Video Art and Short Films, Performance and Acting, Virtual and Digital Art, Digital Graphics and Cartoon, Environmental/Land Art, Urban and Street Art, Art Design;
- Jury: For the 20th edition, the jury brought together figures such as Xiaoyu Weng, curator of Documenta 16 and artistic director of Art in General in New York; Michal Novotný of the National Gallery in Prague; Kostas Stasinopoulos, a curator, writer, and director at Kyklos – Centre of Arts and Cultures in Greece; Emiliano Valdés, an independent curator and Deputy Minister of Culture in Guatemala; Jemima Kulumba, co-founder of the Biennale of Women in Art (WIA); Mario Nanni, an artist and designer who founded fondazionemarionanni and the museovirgola in Bologna; and Anastasia Dawson, an independent curator and art consultant based in Dubai. The 21st edition’s jury included—in addition to the aforementioned Jemima Kulumba—Sarah Crowe, an independent curator, writer, and researcher; Yuko Hasegawa, former director of the 21st Century Museum of Contemporary Art, Kanazawa, and the Museum of Contemporary Art, Tokyo (MOT)—recognized as one of Japan’s most influential and renowned curators and art historians; Wang Chunchen, curator of the China Pavilion at the 55th Venice Biennale in 2013 and a professor at the CAFA Art Museum; Hélio Menezes, co-curator of the acclaimed 2023 São Paulo Biennial and former director of the Museu Afro Brasil Emanoel Araujo in São Paulo; Gianluigi Ricuperati, founder and director of the Institute for Production of Wonder and Nova Express; and, finally, Linzi Stauvers, artistic director at the Ikon Gallery in Birmingham.
- Special Prizes: For the 20th edition, the 13 partners that selected and awarded the artists were: MoCA Association, LITIX Spa, CiAL, Ghisolana Winery, Il Cerchio, and Venice Design Week in Italy; BigCi in Australia; NY20+ in China; Artorale in Germany; ASEM Italia Odv in Mozambique; Ventana in the United States; Al-Tiba9 in Spain; and the MAMAM Museum in Brazil. For the 21st edition, the established network—comprising MoCA Association, BigCi, LITIX Spa, and NY20+—was joined by several significant new partners: The Swatch Art Peace Hotel in China; FOMAS Group, Gabe Tenute, and the Galata – Museum of the Sea in Italy; LAB852 in Croatia; Estudio Rambar in Costa Rica; the Culver City Art Foundation in the United States; Château de Leignon in Belgium; Gallery Studio 76 in Romania; Crossing Art (operating between New York and Shanghai); and the Ricardo Palma University in Peru.
- Overall winners of the 20th and 21st Edition: the international jury of the 20th Edition decided to award the artist Elene Tavadze from Georgia for the videowork "ELENE DARIANI", 2024. For the 21st Edition the absolute prize winner goes to the artist Khamiankova Kseniya, known as Theatrical_hunt from Belarus, for the sculptural photographic work "Routine".
- Collective Exhibition: "New Horizons" Arsenale Nord of Venice, 7 - 29 November, 2026

=== 2024 Edition ===
- Patronage: Ministry of Culture, Ministry of Tourism, the Ministry of Foreign Affairs and International Collaboration, the Ministry of Ecological Transition, the Veneto Region, the Municipality of Venice, Ca’ Foscari University of Venice, Confcommercio Treviso, Confindustria Veneto Est; the Prize achieved a medal from the President of the Italian Republic and recognition by important members of the Advisory Council;
- Prize Sections: Painting, Sculpture and Installation, Photographic Art, Video Art and Short Films, Performance and Acting, Virtual and Digital Art, Digital Graphics and Cartoon, Environmental/Land Art, Urban and Street Art, Art Design;
- Jury: Chris Bayley, Luca Borriello, Chiara Canali, Claudia Segura Campins, Hyunjin Kim, Abdullah Ali;
- Special Prizes: Art Residences (Hong Museum, Blackholes, Fabrica, Huacui, Now:Gallery Art Residency, Taiwan Art Space Alliance, MoCA Art Residency, BigCi, NY20+, Palazzo Valmarana Braga, Azienda Mandranova), Business for Art (Bios Line), Festivals and Exhibitions (Awaji Art Circus and Pasona Group), Sustainability and Art (Coreve, Biorepack, Contarina), Art Gallery (Al-Tiba9 Gallery);
- Collective Exhibition: Arsenale of Venice, November 16 – December 8, 2024

=== 2023-2024 Edition ===
- Patronage: Ministry of Culture, Ministry of Tourism, Ministry of Foreign Affairs and International Collaboration, Ministry of Ecological Transition, the Veneto Region, the Municipality of Venice, Ca’ Foscari University of Venice, Confcommercio Treviso, Confindustria Veneto Est;
- Prize Sections: Painting, Sculpture and Installation, Photographic Art, Video Art and Short Films, Performance and Acting, Virtual and Digital Art, Digital Graphics and Cartoon, Environmental/Land Art, Urban and Street Art, Art Design;
- Jury: Laura Barreca; Giulia Colletti; Krist Gruijthuijsen; Gonzalo Herrero Delicado; David Max Horowitz; Lu Peng;
- Special Prizes: Art Galleries (Cris Contini Contemporary, Luisa Catucci Gallery), Art Residencies (Blackholes, Taiwan Art Space Alliance, Cross Cultural Collaborative, Nongyuan Culture, BigCi, Fabrica, MoCa Art Residency, NoName Studio), "Sustainability & Art" (ARS - Art Reuse Sustainability), Business for Art Prizes (Incalmi, Primopiano Cucine, IED Group), Festivals and Exhibitions (KINDL – Centre for Contemporary Art, BJCEM), Sustainability and Art (Framis Italia, Energiapuntozero), Festivals and Exhibitions (Art Nova 100, BJCEM - Mediterranea 20 - Young Artists Biennale);
- Collective Exhibition: Arsenale of Venice, November 16 – December 8, 2024;
- Winners:
  - Special Prizes:
    - Artistic Residences: Jingyi Wang, Eliza Soroga, Fuka, Giulia Pellegrini, Yukang Tao, Inès Abergel, Yo-Wen Mao, Samanta Malavasi, Audrey Lim, Marco Hemmerling;
    - Business for Art: Caterina Roppo, Ricardo Aleodor Venturi, Claudia Bonollo;
    - Art Galleries: Michael Gordon, Bin Liu;
    - Sustainability and Art: Jingyun Wang, Mario Valdès;
    - Festivals and Exhibitions: Federico Cuatlacuatl, Yo-Wen Mao

=== 2022-2023 Edition ===
- Patronage: Ministry of Foreign Affairs, the Ministry of Culture, the Ministry of the Environment and Protection of Land and Sea, the Veneto Region, the Metropolitan City of Venice, the Municipality of Venice, the Cà Foscari University of Venice and the European Institute of Design.
- Prize Sections: Painting, Photographic Art, Sculpture and Installation, Video Art, Performance, Digital Art, Digital Graphics and Cartoon, Land Art, Urban Art, Art Design.
- Jury: Mohamed Benhadj; Raphael Chikukwa; Giulia Colletti; Paul Di Felice; Chloe Hodge; Dick Spierenburg; Xiaoyu Weng;
- Special Prizes: "Artist in Residence" Prizes (BigCi, Espronceda, Farm Cultural Park, Fabrica, Fonderia Artistica Versiliese), "Artist in Gallery" Prize (Cris Contini Gallery), "Sustainability & Art" (ARS - Art Reuse Sustainability), "Business for Art" Prize (Roberto Cipresso Special Prize, PLANIUM metal-metamorphosis collection, Generali, VENPA S.p.A, Informatic All); "Festivals and Exhibitions" (Art Nova 100, BJCEM - Mediterranea 20 - Young Artists Biennale); "Emerging Artist Award".
- Collective Exhibition: Arsenale of Venice, March 11 - April 16, 2023
- Winners:
  - Sculpture and Installation: Ohau Chen, Taiwan
  - Mentions of Honor: Chih Chiu, Taiwan
- Special Prizes:
  - Artist in Residence: Amalia Foka, Jihyun Park, Mosa One, Toma Gerzha, Gaby Jonna, Gilles Dusabe
  - Artist in Gallery: Cristián Meza
  - Sustainability and Art: Daniel Espinosa
  - Business For Art: Donatella Nobilio, Wu Siou Ming, Vittorio Mandelli, Tiziana Menichelli, Karen Ghostlaw, Henrique EDMX Montanari

=== 2021-2022 Edition ===
- Patronage: Ministry of Foreign Affairs, the Ministry of Culture, the Ministry of the Environment and Protection of Land and Sea, the Veneto Region, the Metropolitan City of Venice, the Municipality of Venice, the Cà Foscari University of Venice and the European Institute of Design.
- Prize Sections: Painting, Photographic Art, Sculpture and Installation, Video Art, Performance, Digital Art, Digital Graphics and Cartoon, Land Art, Urban Art, Art Design.
- Jury: Kobi Ben-Meir; Louise Fedotov-Clements; Pasquale Lettieri; Alka Pande; Danilo Premoli; Alisa Prudnikova;
- Special Prizes: "Artist in Residence" Prizes (Espronceda, KW Institute, RU Residency Unlimited, Art Residency Galliani, Fonderia Artistica Versiliese, Villa Roberti, Villa San Liberale, Villa Rechsteiner), "Artist in Gallery" Prize (Cris Contini Gallery), "Sustainability & Art" (NaturaSì), "Business for Art" Prize (Bios Line); "Festivals and Exhibitions" (Art Nova 100)
- Collective Exhibition: Arsenale of Venice, March 11 - April 16, 2023
  - Winners:
    - Sculpture and Installation: Anna Drozd-Tutaj, Poland
    - Mentions of Honor: Kailum Graves, Australia
  - Special Prizes:
    - Artist in Residence: Larisse Hall, Khalil Charif, Shirin Gunny, Eleonora Monguzzi, Serena Bellini, Jingyun Wang, Luisa Turuani
    - Artist in Gallery: Jens Hesse
    - Sustainability and Art: Marina Gasparini
    - Business For Art: Vittorio Mandelli

=== 2020-2021 Edition ===
- Patronage: Ministry of Foreign Affairs, the Ministry of Cultural Heritage, the Veneto Region, the Municipality of Venice, the Ca' Foscari University of Venice, the European Institute of Design.
- Prize Sections: Painting, Photographic Art, Sculpture and Installation, Video Art and Short Films, Performance, Digital Graphics and Cartoon, Digital Art, Land Art, Urban Art, Art Design.
- Jury: Bénédicte Alliot, Nathalie Angles, Lorenzo Balbi, Marcus Fairs, Matteo Galbiati, Sophie Goltz, Toshiyuki Kita, Beate Reifenscheid.
- Special Prizes: "Artist in Residence" Prizes (Fabrica, Espronceda, Basu Foundation for the Arts, Farm Cultural Park, Labverde), "Artist in Gallery" Prizes (Galerie Isabelle Lesmeister, Jonathan Ferrara Gallery, Arles Gallery, Capsule Gallery, Ki Smith Gallery), "Festival and Exhibitions" Prizes (Al-Tiba9, Art Nova 100, Art Stays Festival), "Business For Art" Prizes (Agnese Design), "Sustainability and Art" Prize: ARS (Art Reuse Sustainability) with Ca' Foscari University and Contarina Spa.
- Collective Exhibition: Arsenale Nord of Venice, October 2–24, 2021
- Winners:
  - Painting and Photographic Art: Witold Riedel, Poland
  - Sculpture and Installation, Land Art, Urban Art: Samuelle Green, United States of America
  - Video Art, Digital graphics, Performance, Virtual Art: Leonardo Sinopoli, Italy
- Special Prizes:
  - Artist in Residence: Inti Guevara, Mohammed El Hajoui, Yohy Suárez, Lorenzo Papanti, Ermina Apostolaki, Chuan Lun Wu
  - Artist in Gallery: Silvia Inselvini, Erwin Redl, Fernanda Luz Avendaño, Zai Nomura, Cyryl Zakrzewski
  - Sustainability and Art: Varvara Grankova, Sandra Lapage
  - Business For Art: Lucia Di Nicolantonio, Lorenzo Mattioli

=== 2019-2020 Edition ===
- Patronage: Ministry of Foreign Affairs, the Ministry of Cultural Heritage, the Veneto Region, the Municipality of Venice, the Ca' Foscari University of Venice, the European Institute of Design.
- Prize Sections: Painting, Sculpture and Installation and Virtual Art, Photographic Art and Digital Graphics, Video Art and Short Films and Performance, Environmental Art / Land Art and Urban Art, Art Design.
- Jury: Igor Zanti, Iwona Blazwick, Karel Boonzaaijer, Valentino Catricalà, Aldo Cibic, Erin Dziedzic, Zhao Li, Riccardo Passoni, Vasili Tsereteli.
- Special Prizes: "Artist in Residence" Prizes (Fabrica, Gridchinhall Gallery and Art Residency, Espronceda, Basu Foundation for the Arts, Farm Cultural Park, Maradiva Cultural Residency), "Artist in Gallery" Prizes (Galerie Isabelle Lesmeister, Jonathan Ferrara Gallery), "Festival and Exhibitions" Prizes (MMOMA Moscow Museum of Modern Art, Art Nova 100, Art Stays Festival), "Business For Art" Prizes (Majer, Outofblue), "Sustainability and Art" Prize: ARS (Art Reuse Sustainability) of aluminium (with (Ca' Foscari University and CIAL)
- Collective Exhibition: Arsenale Nord of Venice, October 2–24, 2021
- Winners:
  - Painting and Photographic Art: Belén Mazuecos, Spain
  - Sculpture and Installation, Land Art, Urban Art: Moshe Vollach, Israel
  - Video Art, Digital graphics, Performance, Virtual Art: Gao Yuan, China
  - Design: Primoz Jeza, Slovenia

=== 2018-2019 Edition ===
- Patronage: Ministry of Foreign Affairs, the Ministry of Cultural Heritage, the Veneto Region, the Municipality of Venice, the Ca' Foscari University of Venice, the European Institute of Design.
- Prize Sections: Painting, Sculpture and Installation and Virtual Art, Photographic Art and Digital Graphics, Video Art and Short Films and Performance, Environmental Art / Land Art and Urban Art, Design (with the support of Antrax).
- Jury: Igor Zanti, Filippo Andreatta, Flavio Arensi, Alfonso Femia, Mattias Givell, Eva Gonzàlez-Sancho, Richard Noyce, Simone Pallotta, Danilo Premoli, Enrico Stefanelli, Alessandra Tiddia, Vasili Tsereteli, Maxa Zoller.
- Special Prizes: "Artist in Residence" Prizes (Open Dream, Lanificio Paoletti, GLO'ART, Espronceda, Basu Foundation for the Arts, Farm Cultural Park, Maradiva Cultural Residency, Centrale Fies, Nuart Festival), "Artist in Gallery" Prizes (Galerie Isabelle Lesmeister, Vàrfok Galéria, Anise Gallery, Jonathan Ferrara Gallery), "Festival and Exhibitions" Prizes (Art Nova 100, Art Stays Festival, TraVellArt di Arte Communications, Photolux Festival), "Business For Art" Prizes (Fraccaro Spumadoro, Tessitura Luigi Bevilacqua, 47 Anno Domini, Maglificio Giordano's), "Sustainability and Art" Prize: ARS (Art Reuse Sustainability) of plastic (with (Ca' Foscari University and COREPLA), "Art Platform & Supporters" Prizes (The Art Spirit Foundation, Biafarin).
- Collective Exhibition: Arsenale of Venice from March 30 to April 25, 2019, 120 finalists.
- Winners:
  - Painting: Ryszard Szozda, Poland
  - Sculpture and Installation and Virtual Art: Jean-Philippe Côté, Canada
  - Photographic Art and Digital Graphics: Silvia Montevecchi, Italy
  - Video Art and Performance: Ginevra Panzetti and Enrico Ticconi, Italy
  - Land Art and Urban Art: Jad El Khoury, Lebanon
  - Design: Elena Colombo, Italy

=== 2017-2018 Edition ===
- Patronage: Ministero per i Beni e le Attività Culturali, Ministero degli Affari Esteri, Regione del Veneto, Comune di Venezia, Città Metropolitana di Venezia, IED Istituto Europeo di Design, Università Cà Foscari di Venezia, Camera di Commercio di Venezia.
- Prize Sections: Painting, Sculpture and Installation and Virtual Art, Photographic Art and Digital Graphics, Video Art and Short Films and Performance, Environmental Art / Land Art and Urban Art
- Jury: Igor Zanti, Domenico De Chirico, Caroline Corbetta, Denis Curti, Nicolangelo Gelormini, Emanuele Montibeller, Simone Pallotta, Nadim Samman, Manuel Segade, Ekaterina Shcherbakova, Eva Wittocx.
- Special Prizes: "Artist in Residence" Prizes (Arte Sella, Farm Cultural Park, The Swatch Art Peace Hotel, Murano Glass ArtResidency, Maradiva Cultural Residency, Basu Foundation for the Arts, GLO’ART, Espronceda, Serigrafia Artistica Fallani, San Francisco Art Residency, The Art Department - Casa dell’Arte International Artists' Residency), "Artist in Gallery" Prizes (Galerie Isabelle Lesmeister, Galeria Fernando Santos, Chelouche Gallery for Contemporary Art), "Festival ed Esposizioni" Prizes (Art Nova 100, Art Stays Festival, Open - Sculptures and installations Exhibition), "Business For Art" Prizes (Biafarin, Manifattura Zanetto, Artmajeur), "Sustainability and Art" Prize: ARS (Art Reuse Sustainability) of glass (Università Ca'Foscari, CoReVe).
- Collective Exhibition: Arsenale of Venice and Tim Future Center from March 17 to April 8, 2018, 115 finalists.
- Winners:
  - Painting: Alessandro Fogo, Italy
  - Sculpture and Installation and Virtual Art: Yukawa-Nakayasu, Japan
  - Photographic Art and Digital Graphics: Rojo Sache, Spain
  - Video Art and Performance: Paula Tyliszczak, Poland
  - Land Art and Urban Art: Gonzalo Borondo, Spain

=== 2016-2017 Edition ===
- Patronage: Ministero per i Beni e le Attività Culturali, Ministero degli Affari Esteri, Regione del Veneto, Comune di Venezia, Provincia di Venezia, IED Istituto Europeo di Design, IUAV di Venezia, Università Cà Foscari di Venezia, Fondazione Musei Civici di Venezia, Camera di Commercio di Venezia, Provincia di Treviso, Ascom Treviso
- Prize Sections: Painting, Sculpture and Installation, Photographic Art, Video Art and Performance, Virtual Art and Digital Graphics, Environmental Art / Land Art
- Jury: Igor Zanti, Flavio Arens, Manuel Borja-Villel, Tamara Chalabi, Paolo Colombo, Suad Garayeva, Ilaria Gianni, Nav Haq, Emanuele Montibeller, Fatoş Üstek, Alma Zevi.
- Special Prizes: "Artist in Residence" Prizes (San Francisco Art Residency, The Art Department - Casa dell’Arte International Artists' Residency, GLO’ART, Taipei Artist Village, Fondazione Berengo, Espronceda, Basu Foundation for the Arts, Serigrafia Artistica Fallani, Salvadori Arte - Fonderia artistica), "Artist in Gallery" Prizes (Salamatina Gallery, Galerie Isabelle Lesmeister, Galeria Fernando Santos, ART re.FLEX Gallery, Chelouche Gallery for Contemporary Art), "Festival ed Esposizioni" Prizes (Art Nova 100, Art Stays Festival, Open - Sculptures and installations Exhibition), "Business For Art" Prizes (Rima Sofa & Beds, Papillover art collection, Eurosystem, Deglupta, Biafarin), "Sustainability and Art" Prize: Paper RRR (Reuse Recycle Reduce) as Art and Design (Università Ca'Foscari, Comieco)
- Collective Exhibition: Arsenale of Venice and Tim Future Center from March 25 to April 9, 2017, 125 finalists.
- Winners:
  - Painting: Elías Peña Salvador, Spagna
  - Sculpture and Installation: Elena Bertuzzi & Laure Chatrefou, Italia & Francia
  - Photographic Art: María Gabriela Chirinos, Venezuela
  - Video Art and Performance: Eliza Soroga, Grecia
  - Virtual and Digital Art: Hill Kobayashi, Giappone
  - Land Art: Branko Stanojević & Milena Strahinović, Serbia

=== 2015-2016 Edition ===
- Patronage: Ministero per i Beni e le Attività Culturali, Ministero degli Esteri, Regione del Veneto, Comune di Venezia, Provincia di Venezia, IED Istituto Europeo di Design, IUAV Venice, Cà Foscari University Venice, Fondazione Musei Civici Venice, Camera di Commercio Venice, Provincia di Treviso, Ascom Treviso
- Prize Sections: Painting, Sculpture and Installation, Photographic Art, Video Art and Performance, Virtual and Digital Art, Land Art
- Jury: Igor Zanti, Miguel Amado, Anna Bernardini, Barbara Boninsegna, Denis Curti, Enrico Fontanari, Suad Garayeva, Vasili Tsereteli, Sabrina Van der Ley, Simone Verde, Bettina von Dziembowski
- Special Prizes: Special Prizes Artist in Residence (Basu Foundations for the Arts, Artistic Serigraphy Fallani, Artistic Foundry Battaglia, Espronceda, Berengo Foundation, Taipei Artist Village, The Swatch Art Peace Hotel), Special Prize Open – Venice, Art Nova 100 - Beijing, Art Stays Festival - Slovenia; Special Prizes Artist in Gallery (Gaia Gallery, Istanbul; Galerie Isabelle Lesmeister, Regensburg; Galeria Fernando Santos, Porto; ART re.FLEX Gallery, Saint Petersburg).
- Business For Art Prizes: Riva 1920, Pas de Rouge, La Tordera
- Collective Exhibition: Arsenale of Venice, from March 19 to April 3, 2016, 120 finalist artists.
- Winners:
  - Painting: Alexander Dashevskiy, Russia
  - Sculpture and Installation: Farid Rasulov, Azerbaijan
  - Photographic Art: Thomas Friedrich Schäfer, Germany
  - Video Art and Performance: Ian Wolter, United Kingdom
  - Virtual and Digital Art: Nicolas Maigret, France
  - Land Art: Elise Eeraerts, Belgium

=== 2014-2015 Edition ===
- Patronage: Ministero per i Beni e le Attività Culturali, Ministero degli Esteri, Regione del Veneto, Comune di Venezia, Provincia di Venezia, IED Istituto Europeo di Design, IUAV Venice, Cà Foscari University Venice, Fondazione Musei Civici Venice, Camera di Commercio Venice, Provincia di Treviso, Ascom Treviso
- Prize Sections: Painting, Sculpture and Installation, Photographic Art, Video Art and Performance, Virtual and Digital Art, Land Art
- Jury: Igor Zanti, Claudio Bertorelli, Simone Frangi, Franck Gautherot, Chus Martinez, Bartolomeo Pietromarchi, Domenico Quaranta, Veeranganakumari Solanki, Philippe Van Cauteren, Jonathan Watkins, Roberto Zancan
- Special Prizes: Special Prizes Artist in Residence (Basu Foundation for the Arts, Artistic Serigraphy Fallani, Artistic Foundry Battaglia, Glass School Abate Zanetti, Art Stays), Special Prize Open – Venice, Art Nova 100 - Beijing
- Business For Art Prizes: Riva 1920, Pas de Rouge, La Tordera
- Collective Exhibition: Arsenale of Venice, from March 21 to April 5, 2015, 120 finalist artists.
- Winners:
  - Painting: Noemi Staniszewska, Poland
  - Sculpture and Installation: Christine Kettaneh, Lebanon
  - Photographic Art: Christopher Sims, United States
  - Video Art and Performance: Gilles Fontolliet, Switzerland
  - Virtual and Digital Art: Roberto Fassone, Italy
  - Land Art: Andrew Friend, United Kingdom

=== 2013-2014 Edition ===
- Patronage: Ministero per i Beni e le Attività Culturali, Ministero degli Esteri, Regione del Veneto, Comune di Venezia, Provincia di Venezia, IED Istituto Europeo di Design, IUAV Venice, Cà Foscari University Venice.
- Prize Sections: Painting, Sculpture and Installation, Photographic Art, Video Art and Performance, Virtual and Digital Art.
- Jury: Igor Zanti, Enrico Bettinello, Silvia Ferri de Lazara, Victoria Lu, Domenico Quaranta, Veeranganakumari Solanki, Miguel Amado, Sabrina Van Der Ley, Andrea Viliani, Jonathan Watkins, Claudia Zanfi.
- Special Prizes: Special Prizes Artist in Residence (Loft Miramarmi, Artistic Foundry Battaglia, India ARTresidency in collaboration with Technymon, Norimberga ARTresidency, Glass School Abate Zanetti, Art Stays), Special Prize Open – Venice, Art Nova 100 - Beijing, Innovative Interactive Tour on Telecom Italia Future Centre - Venice.
- Business For Art Prize: Riva 1920
- Collective Exhibition: Arsenale of Venice, from March 22 to April 6, 2014, 110 finalist artists.
- Winners:
  - Painting: Bianca De Gier, The Netherlands
  - Sculpture and Installation: Elaine Byrne, Ireland
  - Photographic Art: Victoria Campillo, Spain
  - Video Art and Performance: Apiyo Amolo, Kenya
  - Virtuale and Digital Art: Émilie Brout & Maxime Marion, France

=== 2012-2013 Edition ===
- Patronage: Ministero per i Beni e le Attività Culturali, Regione del Veneto, Comune di Venezia, Provincia di Venezia, Istituto Europeo di Design, IUAV di Venezia, Università Ca' Foscari di Venezia.
- Prize Sections: Painting, Sculpture and Installation, Photographic Art, Video Art and Performance, Virtual Art-iFope.
- Jury: Umberto Angelini, Gabriella Belli, Gabriella Belli, Adam Budak, Cecilia Freschini, Mario Gerosa, Kanchi Mehta, Sabine Schaschl, Felix Schöber, Claudia Zanfi, Igor Zanti.
- Special Prizes: Special Prizes Artist in Residence (Technymon India ARTresidency, Loft Miramarmi, Glass School Abate Zanetti, Art Stays, Beijing Art Residency in collaboration with Lab-Yit, iaab), Special Prize Open – Internazional Exhibition of Sculptures and Installations, Venice.
- Business For Art Prize: FOPE Gioielli
- Collective Exhibition: Arsenale of Venice, from March 16 to March 31, 2013, 110 finalist artists.
- Winners:
  - Painting: Ivelisse Jimenez
  - Sculpture and Installation: Costantine Zlatev
  - Photographic Art: Richard Ansett
  - Video Art and Performance: Carlos Martiel
  - Virtual Art: Zer Nirit

=== 2011-2012 Edition ===
- Patronage: Ministero degli Affari Esteri, Provincia di Treviso, Comune di Venezia, Municipalità di Venezia, ASCOM Treviso.
- Prize Sections: Painting, Sculpture, Photographic Art, Video Art and Performance, Virtual Art.
- Jury Institutional Prizes: Alessio Antoniolli, Chiara Barbieri, Gabriella Belli, Ilaria Bonacossa, Soledad Gutierrez, Kanchi Mehta, Ludovico Pratesi, Maria Savarese, Ralf Schmitt, Alma Zevi, Igor Zanti.
- Special Prizes: Special Prizes Artist in Residence (Technymon India ARTresidency, Loft Miramarmi, Glass School Abate Zanetti, Art Stays, Carlo Zauli Museum, iaab), Special Prize "Tina b.", Special Prize "Open Arte Communication", Personal Exhibitions in a network of 27 galleries.
- Business For Art Prize: Special Prize "STILE Original Design"
- Collective Exhibition: Arsenale of Venice, from March 17 to April 1, 2012, 110 finalist artists.
- Winners:
  - Painting: Cristina Gardumi
  - Sculpture: Simone Bubbico
  - Photographic Art: Torsten Schumann
  - Video Art and Performance: Luis Bezeta
  - Virtual Art: Amelia Zhang

=== 2010-2011 Edition ===
- Patronage: Ministero degli Affari Esteri, Regione del Veneto, Istituto Europeo di Design.
- Prize Sections: Painting, Sculpture, Photographic Art, Video Art, Performance.
- Jury Institutional Prizes: Chiara Barbieri, Rossella Bertolazzi, Monika Burian, Gianfranco Maraniello, Luca Panaro, Ludovico Pratesi, Maja Skerbot, Valentina Tanni, Matteo Zauli, Kristian Jarmuschek, Igor Zanti.
- Special Prizes: Special Prizes Artist in Residence (Glass School Abate Zanetti, Claudio Buziol Foundation, Carlo Zauli Museum, Art Stays), Special Prize "Tina b.", Special Prize "Open Arte Communication", Special Prize "Press Room", Personal Exhibitions in a network of 34 galleries.
- Business For Art Prize: "ReiL"
- Collective Exhibition: Arsenale of Venice, from March 12 to March 22, 2011, 180 finalist artists.
- Winners:
  - Painting: Miazbrothers
  - Sculpture: Daniele Geminiani
  - Photographic Art: Lottie Davies
  - Video Art: IOCOSE
  - Performing Arts: La Badini collettivo perforante

=== 2009 Edition ===
- Patronage: Ministero degli Affari Esteri, Regione del Veneto, Istituto Europeo di Design.
- Prize Sections: Painting, Sculpture, Photographic Art.
- Jury Institutional Prizes: Igor Zanti, Rossella Bertolazzi, Viviana Siviero, Alessandro Trabucco, Stefano Coletto; Lorenzo Respi.
- Special Prizes: Special Prize "Catch by the Eye, Save in the Heart 2010", London; Collective Exhibition at the Italian Cultural Institutes in Vienna and Prague; Personal Exhibitions in a network of 19 galleries.
- Business For Art Prize: "Art Collection Tenuta S. Anna"
- Collective Exhibition: Arsenale of Venice, from March 6 to March 27, 2010, 180 finalist artists.
- Winners:
  - Painting: Sergio Padovani
  - Sculpture: Olga Schigal
  - Photographic Art: Dean West

=== 2008 Edition ===
- Patronage: Provincia di Treviso, Provincia di Venezia, Regione del Veneto, Istituto Europeo di Design
- Prize Sections: Painting, Sculpture, Photographic Art
- Jury Institutional Prizes: Igor Zanti, Annalisa Rosso, Carlo Sala, Viviana Siviero, Gloria Vallese Rossella Bertolazzi, Marcello Carriero, Laurent Fabry, Ilaria Piccioni, Giovanni Bianchi, Ilaria Simeoni
- Special Prizes: Special Prize "Inside Art", Special Prize "Radio Imago", Special Prize Seroxcult.com, Special Prize "Photosapiens.com", Special Prize "Virtual Jury", Personal Exhibitions in a network of 12 galleries.
- Business For Art Prize: "Capo d'Opera"
- Collective Exhibition: Brolo Centro d'Arte e Cultura, Mogliano Veneto, 18 October - 2 November 2008 (30 painting finalists), Fondazione Benetton Studi e Ricerche, Treviso, 4–19 October 2008 (30 sculpture finalists), Exhibition Venue "In Paradiso", Giardini della Biennale di Venezia, 22 October - 2 November 2008 (30 photographic art finalists).
- Winners:
  - Painting: Pierluigi Febbraio
  - Sculpture: Dania Zanotto
  - Photographic Art: Paolo Angelosanto

=== 2007 Edition ===
- Patronage: Provincia di Treviso, Regione del Veneto, Accademia di Belle Arti di Venezia Venice
- Prize Sections: Painting, Photographic Art
- Jury Institutional Prizes: Michele Chiole (Chair of Jury), Corrado Cecconato, Emilio Lippi, Igor Zanti, Carlo Sala, Elisabetta Donaggio, Christine Poli, Ilaria Simeoni.
- Special Prizes: Special Prize "Galleria Polin", Special Prize "Wannabee Art Gallery", Special Prize "Galleria Paci Arte", Special Prize "3D Art Gallery", Special Prize "Virtual Jury".
- Collective Exhibition: Santa Caterina Museum, Treviso 7–28 September 2007, Palazzo Scotti, Treviso 19–31 October 2007, Traveling Exhibition, Mogliano Veneto, 10 November - 2 December 2007, Brolo Centro d'Arte e Cultura in Mogliano Veneto, 25 November - 2 December 2007, Galleria III Millennio, Venice 12–29 December 2007
- Winners:
  - Painting: Michela Pedron
  - Photographic Art: Michael Kai

=== 2006 Edition ===
- Patronage: Provincia di Treviso, Regione del Veneto, Accademia di Belle Arti di Venezia, Venice
- Prize Sections: Painting
- Jury Institutional Prizes: Rita Fazzello, Roberto Zamberlan, Corrado Castellani, Lucia Majer, Igor Zanti
- Special Prizes: Special Prize "Scent of woman"
- Collective Exhibition: Brolo Centro d'Arte e Cultura in Mogliano Veneto (Treviso)
- Winners: Laura Pozzar

== See also ==
- List of European art awards
