= Novotný (surname) =

Novotný (feminine Novotná) is a Czech and Slovak surname. Notable persons with that surname include:

- Anna Dasha Novotny (born 2000), American country singer-songwriter
- Antonín Novotný (1904–1975), Czechoslovak president 1957–1968
- Antonín Novotný (actor) (1913–2005), Czech film actor
- Antonín Novotný (chess composer) (1827–1871), Czech chess composer
- Antonín Novotný (water polo), Czech Olympic water polo player in 1920
- Boris Novotný (born 1976), Slovak judoka
- David Novotný (born 1969), Czech actor
- David Jan Novotný (born 1947), Czech writer
- Eduard Novotný (1921–?), Czech bobsledder
- Franz Novotny (born 1949), Austrian film producer, director, screenwriter
- Franz Nikolaus Novotny (1743–1773), Austrian organist and composer at the Esterházy court
- Fritz Novotny (1903–1983), Austrian art historian
- Geeta Novotny, American mezzo-soprano and writer
- Irena Novotná-Česneková (born 1972), Czech biathlete
- Jakub Novotný (born 1979), Czech volleyball player
- Jan Novotný (1929–2005), Czech glass artist and painter
- Jan Novotný (footballer) (born 1982), Czech football midfielder
- Jana Novotná (1968–2017), Czech tennis player
- Jarmila Novotná (1907–1994), Czech actress
- Jeanne Novotny, American professor of nursing
- Jiří Novotný (footballer) (born 1970), Czech football defender
- Jiří Novotný (futsal player) (born 1988), Czech futsal defender
- Jiří Novotný (ice hockey) (born 1983), Czech ice hockey centre
- John Novotny (1918–2006), American basketball player
- Josef Novotný (born 1956), Czech volleyball player
- Kamila Novotná (born 2005), Slovak sport shooter
- Kateřina Novotná (born 1984), Czech short- and long-track speed-skater
- Manfred Novotný (fl. 1960s), Czech luger
- Mariella Novotny (1941–1983), English socialite and prostitute involved in the Profumo affair
- Mark Novotny, American physicist
- Michal Novotný (born 1981), Czech snowboarder
- Michal Novotný (curator) (born 1985), Czech art curator, critic, and writer
- Milos Novotny (born 1942), American chemist
- Monica Novotny, American television journalist
- Nancy Novotny, American voice actress
- Nataša Novotná (born 1977), Czech dancer and choreographer
- Ondřej Novotný (born 1998), Czech football forward
- Paul Novotny (born 1966), American politician in Minnesota
- Pavel Novotný (born 1973), Czech football defensive midfielder
- Petra Novotná (orienteer) (born 1966), Czech orienteering competitor
- Petra Novotná (volleyball) (born 1981), Czech volleyball player
- Radek Novotný (born 1984), Czech orienteering competitor
- Ray Novotny (1907–1995), US football player
- Reid Novotny (born 1978), American politician in Maryland
- René Novotný (born 1963), Czech figure skater
- Roman Novotný (born 1986), Czech long jumper
- Růžena Novotná (born 1941), Czech canoer
- Sabrina Novotná (born 2000), Czech handball player
- Štěpán Novotný (born 1990), Czech ice hockey winger
- Tuva Novotny (born 1979), Swedish actress and singer
- Viliam Novotný (born 1973), Slovak neurosurgeon and politician
- Vlasta Novotna (born 1890s), Czech dancer

== Fictional ==
- Debbie Novotny, in the American TV series Queer as Folk
- Hunter Novotny-Bruckner, in the American TV series Queer as Folk
- Michael Novotny, in the American TV series Queer as Folk

== See also ==
- Nowotny as a surname
