= List of European art awards =

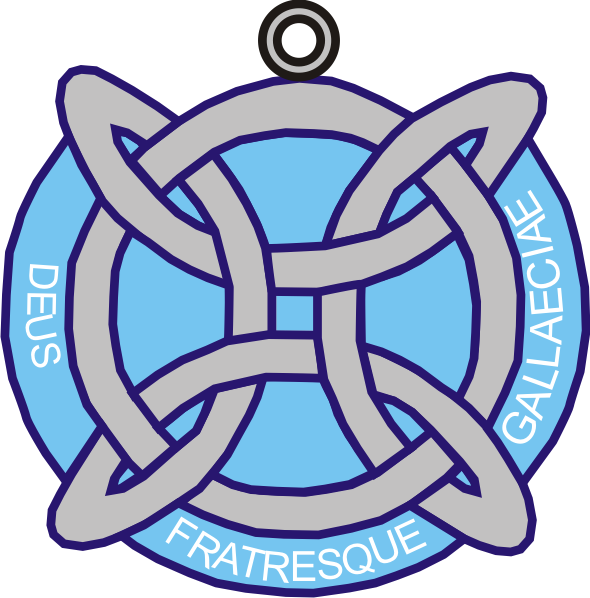
Castelao Medal

This list of European art awards covers some of the main art awards given by organizations in Europe. Some are restricted to artists in a particular genre or from a given country or region, while others are broader in scope. The list is organized by region.

== Eastern Europe ==
Country	Award	Sponsor	Notes
Baltic states	Baltic Assembly Prize for Literature, the Arts and Science	Baltic Assembly	Outstanding achievements in three categories: literature, art and science
Slovenia	Jakopič Award	Academy of Fine Arts and Design etc.	Achievements in the fine arts children's literature
Czech Republic	Jindřich Chalupecký Award	Jindřich Chalupecký Society	Young visual artists: Czech citizens under the age of 35.
Poland	Paszport Polityki	Polityka	Various categories
Poland	Nagroda Sztuki im. Marii Anto & Elsy von Freytag-Loringhoven	Maria Anto & Elsa von Freytag-Loringhoven International Art Prize	Visual Art categories
Poland	Kazimierz Ostrowski Award	Association of Polish Artists and Designers	Polish artists and designers in recognition of their excellence
Ukraine	Future Generation Art Prize	Victor Pinchuk Foundation	Discover, recognize and give long-term support to a future generation of artists
Ukraine	Honored Worker of Ukraine Culture		
Ukraine	Merited Artist of Ukraine		
Ukraine	People's Artist of Ukraine		
Ukraine	Shevchenko National Prize		
Ukraine	Vasyl Stus Prize		

== South Europe ==
Country	Award	Sponsor	Notes
Greece	Artist of the Year	International Interartia Festival - International Art Society & Academy	Artists who gain a first prize (World Award) in all competitions held within the framework of the present InterArtia Festival
Greece	InterArtia World Award in Art (InterArtia Prize)	International Interartia Festival - International Art Society & Academy	Various categories

== Scandinavia ==
Country	Award	Sponsor	Notes
Denmark	C. F. Hansen Medal	Royal Danish Academy of Fine Arts	Outstanding contribution to architecture
Denmark	Crown Prince Couple's Awards	Frederik, Crown Prince of Denmark and Mary, Crown Princess of Denmark	Various categories
Denmark	Eckersberg Medal	Royal Danish Academy of Fine Arts	
Denmark	Fogtdal Photographers Award	Palle Fogtdal	Danish photography
Denmark	N. L. Høyen Medal	Royal Danish Academy of Fine Arts	Art historians and other theorists, arts administrators, educators and journalists
Denmark	Sonning Prize	University of Copenhagen	
Denmark	Tagea Brandt Rejselegat	Tagea Brandt Rejselegat foundation	Women who have made a significant contribution in science, literature or art.
Denmark	Thorvald Bindesbøll Medal	Royal Danish Academy of Fine Arts	
Denmark	Thorvaldsen Medal	Royal Danish Academy of Fine Arts	
Finland	Ars Fennica Award	Henna and Pertti Niemistö Ars Fennica Art Foundation	
Norway	Oslo City art award		
Sweden	Karlskoga Nobel Art scholarship		
Sweden	Prince Eugen Medal	Monarch of Sweden	
Sweden	Rolf Schock Prizes	Royal Swedish Academy of Fine Arts	

== Western Europe ==
Country	Award	Sponsor	Notes
Belgium	Prix Godecharle	Godecharle Foundation	Young artists
Belgium	Prix de Rome (Belgium)	Federal Government of Belgium	Scholarship for arts students
France	Abd-el-Tif prize	Company of the French Orientalist Painters	(No longer awarded)
France	Cartazini Art Award	France: Cartazini Gallery, Paris)	
France	Marcel Duchamp Prize	Association pour la Diffusion Internationale de l'Art Français (ADIAF)	
France	Prix Fénéon	University of Paris	
France	Prix Fondation d'entreprise Ricard France		
France	Puvis de Chavannes Prize	Société Nationale des Beaux-Arts	
France	Prix de Rome	French Academy	(no longer awarded)
France	Saint-Affrique Prize		
France	Prix Théophile Schuler		
Germany	Art Prize of the German Democratic Republic	German Democratic Republic	(no longer awarded)
Germany	Bernd and Hilla Becher Award	City of Düsseldorf	
Germany	Cologne Fine Art Award	Cologne Trade Fair Company and Federal Association of German Art Publishers	(no longer awarded)
Germany	Dorothea von Stetten Art Award	Kunstmuseum Bonn	
Germany	Imke Folkerts Prize for Fine Arts		
Germany	Käthe Kollwitz Prize	Academy of Arts, Berlin	
Germany	KAIROS Prize	Alfred Toepfer Foundation	
Germany	August Macke Prize		
Germany	Schwabing Art Prize		
Germany	Szpilman Award	Szpilman	
Germany	Villa Massimo		
Germany	Villa Romana Prize		
Germany	ars viva	Kulturkreis der deutschen Wirtschaft	artists being under the age of 35 living in Germany
Italy	Arte Laguna Prize	Venice	
Italy	Premio Presidente della Repubblica	Accademia di San Luca, Accademia di Santa Cecilia	
Italy	Rome Prize	American Academy in Rome	
Italy	Young European Artist Trieste Contemporanea Award	Trieste Contemporanea	
Italy	Salimbeni Prize		
Luxembourg	Prix Grand-Duc Adolphe	Cercle artistique de Luxembourg	
Monaco	Prince Pierre of Monaco Foundation prizes	Prince Pierre of Monaco Foundation)	
Netherlands	Buning Brongers Award		
Netherlands	Charlotte Köhler Prize		
Netherlands	Clickburg Webcomic Awards		
Netherlands	Heineken Prizes		
Netherlands	Hendrik Chabot Award		
Netherlands	Lex van Rossen Award		
Netherlands	Prix de Rome (Netherlands)	Rijksakademie	
Netherlands	Sandberg Prize (Netherlands)		
Netherlands	The Vincent Award		
Netherlands	Wilhelmina-ring		
Netherlands	World Press Photo of the Year		
Netherlands	Amsterdam Museum Square Award		
Portugal	Prémio Autores	Sociedade Portuguesa de Autores	
Spain	Castelao Medal		
Switzerland	Bâloise Prize	Bâloise group	
Switzerland	SEETAL		

== United Kingdom ==
Award	Sponsor	Notes
Artes Mundi	Artes Mundi arts charity, Cardiff	Contemporary art exhibition and prize
Artraker Annual Award	Artraker	Artworks that help shape and inspire through visual arts how people and organisations understand, engage and respond to war, violent conflict and social upheaval.
Beck's Futures	Institute of Contemporary Arts	Contemporary artists (no longer awarded)
BP Portrait Award	National Portrait Gallery	
Centenary Medal (RPS)	Royal Photographic Society	
Cherry Kearton Medal and Award	Royal Geographical Society	Traveller concerned with the study or practice of natural history, with a preference for those with an interest in nature photography, art or cinematography".
Daiwa Foundation Art Prize	Daiwa Anglo-Japanese Foundation	British artist for a first solo show at a gallery in Japan
Garrick/Milne Prize	Garrick Club	(no longer awarded)
Glyndŵr Award	Machynlleth Tabernacle Trust, Wales	
Gold Medal (National Eisteddfod of Wales)	National Eisteddfod of Wales	
Guthrie Award	Royal Scottish Academy	Scottish based artist under 35 for outstanding work.
Hepworth Prize for Sculpture	The Hepworth Wakefield	British or UK-based artist of any age, at any stage in their career, who has made a significant contribution to the development of contemporary sculpture".
Jerwood Drawing Prize	Drawing Projects UK and Jerwood Foundation, UK	
Jerwood Painting Prize	Jerwood Foundation	(no longer awarded)
John Moores Painting Prize	Walker Art Gallery	
Jolomo Award	Jolomo Foundation	
K Foundation art award	K Foundation	Worst artist of the year
Lumière Award (RPS)	Royal Photographic Society	
Lynn Painter-Stainers Prize	Worshipful Company of Painter-Stainers and the Lynn Foundation	
Max Mara Art Prize for Women		
New Contemporaries		
Outstanding Service Award (RPS)	Royal Photographic Society	
Progress Medal (RPS)	Royal Photographic Society	
Jill Smythies Award
Sky Academy Arts Scholarship
South Bank Sky Arts Awards	Sky Arts	
Threadneedle Prize	Mall Galleries	
Trinity Buoy Wharf Drawing Prize	Trinity Buoy Wharf Trust	Contemporary drawing
Turner Prize	Tate	British art
Welsh Artist of the Year	St David's Hall, Cardiff	Amateur and professional artists who have a link to Wales
Youmanity Award	Youmanity	Photography award.

== See also ==
- Lists of awards
- Lists of art awards
