= Novotny =

Novotný or Novotny may refer to:

- Novotny (chess), a device found in some chess problems
- Novotny (surname), people with the surname Novotny

== See also ==
- Nowotny
