= Modhir Ahmed =

Iraqi-Swedish artist (born 1956)

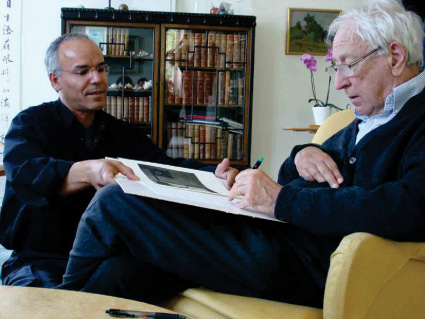
- Tomas Tranströmer and Modhir Ahmed (Stockholm, March 30, 2007)
- Born: 1956 (age 69–70); Baghdad, Kingdom of Iraq
- Education: Baghdad Institute of Fine Arts (1974–79); Academy of Fine Arts in Warsaw (1981–86)
- Known for: Painter

Modhir Ahmed (born 1956) is an Iraqi-Swedish artist.

== Life and work ==
Born in Baghdad, Iraq, Modhir Ahmed has lived in Poland and Sweden. Modhir Ahmed studied at Baghdad Institute of Fine Arts (1974–79) and received a BFA Major in Graphic Arts. He spent his leisure time at the national museum, drawing and studying the basic principles of abstract and minimalist art. Inspired by his Polish professors Modhir pursued studies in Poland, leaving Iraq in 1980, a few months before the Iran/Iran war. After completing five years at the Academy of Fine Arts in Warsaw (1981–86) he achieved an MFA Major in Painting. Modhir then went to Sweden where he studied computer graphics in Skövde to develop his printmaking techniques (1990–91). He became director of The Print Workshop in Falun. Modhir gained a Karlskoga Nobel Art scholarship in Karlskoga, Sweden in 2000 for his contribution to the graphic arts.

In 2007, Modhir made an artist's book on Tomas Tranströmer’s Galleriet, entitled Vecka nr.II.

Together with partner artist/art critic Maria Vivero, he worked on a project about Rashid bin Khalifa Al Khalifa, which gave rise to the book Rashid bin Khalifa Al Khalifa, 40 years of painting, from himself, by himself, for himself, a Shaikh's retrospective.

In January 2012, Modhir Ahmed had his 35 year's Retrospective exhibition curated by Anne Seppanen at Dalarnas Museum in Falun. The exhibition will travel in October to Borås, the artist first residence in Sweden, and will be shown at Algarden Gallery. He recently visited the northern part of Iraq after 30 years.

== Selected awards and scholarships ==
- 1986: Polish Cultural Department Scholarship, Warsaw, Poland
- 1992: The 10th Norwegian International Print Triennial, Fredrikstad, Norway (Jury prize)
- 1995: The 11th Norwegian International Print Triennial, Fredrikstad, Norway (1st prize)
- 1997: The Annie Bergman Graphic Fund, Sweden
- 1999: Schreiters Travel Scholarship in Grafikens Hus, Mariafred, Sweden
- 2000: Alfred Nobel Art Scholarship, Karlskoga, Sweden
- 2000 Xth Józef Gielniak Graphic Art Competition, Jelenia Góra, Poland (Distinction)
- 2002 11th International Small Graphic Forms, Lódz, Poland (Medal of Honour)
- 2003 Print Triennale-Kraków-2003, Kraków, Poland (Award of Canson Poland)
- 2006 5th Egyptian International Print Triennial, Cairo, Egypt (Triennial prize)
- 2006 Award of Andrioll Drawing Competition, Naleczow, Poland
- 2006 7e Triennale De Chamalières, France (Jury prize)
- 2008 13th International Small Graphic Forms, Lódz, Poland (Medal of Honour)
- 2009 2nd Guanlan International Print Biennial 2009, Shenzhen, China (Guanlan International Print Prize)
- 2009 International Drawing Triennial MANU PROPRIA, 2009, Tallinn, Estonia
- 2009 International Print Triennale-Kraków-2009, Kraków, Poland (Statutory Award of the MTG – Kraków 2009)

== Selected bibliography ==
- Ljiljana Cinkul Belgrade, ‘Grafik’ Graficki Kolektiv Gallery, exhibition catalogue, Belgrade, Yugoslavia, February 2005
- Alf Johansson, ‘Lanstinget och kulturen’ Dalarnas Cultural Programme 2005, Dalarnas, Sweden
- Jordi Arko, ‘Maddelanden Foreningen for Grafisk Konst’ National Museum, 2006 ars porfolj, Stockholm, Sweden
- Karin Perers, ‘Rymd. Rytm. Rum.’ Avesta Art 2006, exhibition catalogue, Avesta, Sweden
- Krzysztof Szymanwicz, ‘Salong Ost,’ exhibition catalogue, Rattviks, Sweden, April 2006
- Eva Liden, ‘Falu Konstgrafiska Verkstad 50 Ar,’ exhibition catalogue, Falun, Sweden, April 2006
- Richard Noyce, ‘Printmaking at the Edge’ book about the condition and direction of Print Art, published by A&C Black (London), UK, April 2006, pp. 121–123
- Maria Vivero, ‘Modhir Ahmed’ Bahrain Clientele Magazine issue 10, Bahrain, May 2007, pp. 6–10
- Richard Noyce, ‘Falu Triennalen 2007,’ exhibition catalogue, Falun, August 2007
- Maria Vivero, ‘Portrait of an International Artist ’ Ohlala Magazine, Bahrain, September 2009, pp. 26–31
- Maria Vivero, ‘Iraq:Two faces ’ Two-Man show with Faisel Laibi Sahi, Exhibition catalogue, Bahrain, January 2010
- Arabian Knight Magazine, ‘Taking it to the limits ’ Vol. 12, Issue 4, Bahrain, Autumn 2010
- Meem Gallery ‘Art in Iraq Today - Part 1 ’Exhibition Catalogue, Dubai, UAE, October 2010
- Meem Gallery ‘Art in Iraq Today’co-published by Skira and Meem Editions, sponsored by Crescent Petroleum, Dubai, UAE, October 2011
- Anne Seppanen, Maria Vivero ‘Modhir Ahmed: 35 Years Retrospective’ Exhibition catalogue, Dalarnas museum, Falun, Sweden, January 2012
- Bjorn Bredstrom, Modhir Ahmed, Grafik Nytt, Sweden, May 2012

== See also ==
- Iraqi art
- Islamic art
- List of Iraqi artists
