= Ramón Castellano de Torres =

Spanish artist (1947)

Ramón Castellano de Torres (born 31 August 1947 in Ceuta, Spain) is a Spanish artist. Art critics are in the habit of cataloguing him as a fundamentally expressionist painter, but his long artistic career and his wide variety of styles and cultivation of various technologies make it risky to do so categorically.

The son of a draftsman and of a painter, Castellano decided to devote himself to the plastic arts at a very early age. Since 1976 he has resided in Morón de la Frontera (Seville).

Ramón Castellano's painting is sustained on two fundamental props: composition and color, varying from pure academic realism, with marine and urban landscapes, to severe abstract expressionism with the juxtapositions of color and the studied composition developed in all his works.

His catalogued works, numbering in the thousands, are distributed widely in Spain and around the world, especially in Japan, Germany, Argentina, Cuba and the United States. Castellano has works displayed in art galleries including: Artelista, My Gallery, Museum Cross Blacksmith, Artmajeur International (California), Arshumana, From the Plastic arts (Sculpture, Argentina), With the Art, Spectrum, Galleon Hispavista, To liberate Yourself, There cures Society International, Artatoo, GVAES Gallery of Spanish Art, Key Patron (Republic Argentina), Blue Ice, Art Vital, Dynamical Art, Art Today, The Friends of the Art, Art Tract, Empires, Art in Ligne, Álvaro Hernández, DevianART (Hollywood, California), Gallery Aberta (Porto, Portugal), Civila, Hispanic World, Your Art, Artede, Digital Consciousness Artist Database, Dotecome (Portugal), Foundation Antonio Segovia Lobillo, Contemporary Matetena Arte, Avisen-Avk Art Gallery (Denmark), Margencero Revista Haystack, Art Enebral, Babele Arte (Italy), The Saatchi Gallery (Your Gallery) of London, Lakewood's Yessy Gallery (Colorado).

He is a contributor of articles and illustrations to cultural and pedagogic magazines such as "Oil-mill", "From the Border", "Kikiriki", etc., and is the illustrator of diverse children's stories. He has written and published several books on the history, geography and artistic monuments of Morón de la Frontera.
