= Ansett (disambiguation) =

Ansett may refer to:

- Ansett Australia defunct airline
- Ansett New Zealand, defunct airline
- Ansett Pioneer, defunct Australian coach line
- Reg Ansett, founder of Ansett Australia
- Richard Ansett photographer
