= Anna King (artist) =

Scottish artist

- Born: Anna King; Shetland, Scotland, UK
- Education: Duncan of Jordanstone College of Art and Design
- Known for: Painting
- Movement: landscape art
- Awards: Jolomo Award

Blinkbonnie Quarry - one of Anna King's first prize pictures for the Jolomo Award 2007

Anna King, is a Scottish landscape artist "who seeks out forgotten spaces and derelict buildings."

She was born in Shetland, spent most of her life in the Scottish Borders, and lives in the village of Greenlaw, near Kelso.

She first came to attention of the general public at her degree show at Dundee's Duncan of Jordanstone College of Art and Design in 2005.

== Awards ==
In 2017, she won the top prize of £20,000 in the annual Jolomo Award, established by John Lowrie Morrison and awarded to Scottish Landscape Artists.

She also received the Royal Scottish Academy Landscape Award from the RSA Student Exhibition and also received the Ian Eadie Award from the Duncan of Jordanstone College of Art and Design

== Exhibitions ==
She has had solo exhibitions at:

- Open Eye Gallery in Edinburgh
- Beaux Art Gallery Bath
- 108 Fine Art, Harrogate

She has also exhibited at many other art galleries including the Glasgow Art Fair and the Gallery Heinzel.

== TV ==
She featured on the BBC Coast Series, when Alice Roberts visited her during one of her residencies at the Watchie and explored what drew Joan Eardley to Catterline. Also she is the featured artist in a recent Blackberry Ad which shows William Ramsay, founder of the Affordable Art Fair, visiting the artist and then using his BlackBerry Torch to share her paintings with his colleagues. She also featured in a BBC program "Making Art Work: First Idea to Final Piece"

== Art ==
She normally works in oil and pencil, on paper and board.

"This gifted young artist has spent the past two winters working at Joan Eardley's clifftop studio at Catterline. The results are very different from Eardley's wild, densely painted seascapes: cooler, more cerebral, with an almost icy range of colours. Yet something of Eardley's response to nature as an untameable force is echoed in King's bleakly attractive images of post-industrial landscapes: empty feral places where nature is slowly reclaiming the land."
