= Yorgos Foudoulis =

Greek classical guitarist and composer

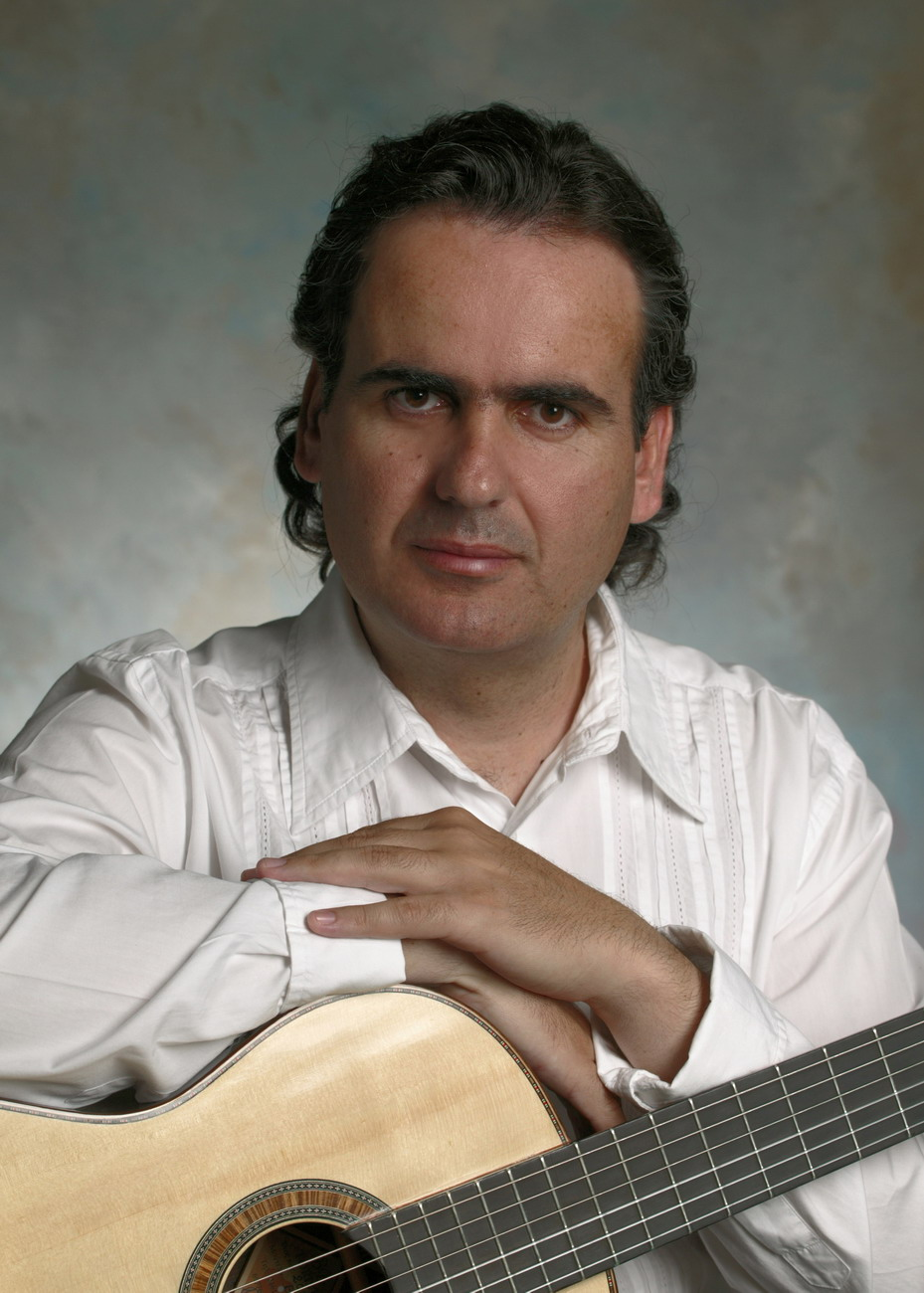

Yorgos Foudoulis is a Greek classical guitarist and composer. His professional activities include performing, master classes, editing, and recording.

He is the director of the Examination Center of Trinity College London in Volos, Greece, and the conservatory bearing his name. Yorgos Foudoulis is also the president of the International Examination board / center of the International Art Academy in Volos.

He is an artistic director in the Winter Guitar Festival of Volos and the Porto Heli International Guitar Festival, and chairman of the International Art Society.

== Biography ==
Foudoulis was born in Volos, Thessaly, Greece.

He obtained his Teaching Diploma from the Philharmonic Conservatory of the Municipality of Volos and his Soloist Diploma from the New Conservatory of Music in Thessaloniki by Costas Kotsiolis. He also obtained his postgraduate diploma, Fellowship Diploma of Trinity College London (FTCL).

As a young guitarist, he won many first prizes in international guitar competitions and attended a number of seminars including those with Leo Brouwer, Alirio Diaz, and David Russell.

He has given many concerts in Greece as well as abroad (Germany, Italy, Poland, Portugal, Bulgaria, Serbia, Turkey, Cuba) and he has made recordings for the ERT (Greek Radio Television).

From 1989 he has participated as a soloist and teacher in Greek and international festivals, such as the Volos International Guitar Festival, International Festival of Istanbul, Zory International Guitar Festival, Corfu International Guitar Festival, Hermoupolis International Guitar Festival, Porto Heli International Festival Art & Culture, Chorlton International Festival, etc.

He has performed, as a soloist, in a variety of ensembles, with the Symphonic Orchestra of the Moscow Conservatory, the Symphonic orchestra of Larisa as well as in small ensembles of chamber music.

He participated in the activities "Youth for the Arts", which was organized by the Organization for the European Capital of Culture, Thessaloniki 1997.

He has composed guitar soloist music, chamber music, music for theater, etc. He has also written a number of books about the guitar teaching method.

The International Art Society & Academy where Yorgos Foudoulis is the founder and chairman each year organizes the International Interartia Festival.

== Bibliography ==
- 1988 : The Preliminary Study of the Guitar Part A' (EYF)
- 1998 : The Preliminary Study of the Guitar Part Β' (EYF)
- 2004 : Music for Guitar Volume 1 (EYF)
- 2004 : Music for Guitar, Volume 2 (EYF)
- 2006 : "Iolkos", "Oracle", "Omen". Music for Flute and Guitar (BERBEN)
- 2006 : "Christina", "Fullmoon", "Ether". Music for classical guitar (BERBEN)
- 2006 : "Delirium" for 4 guitars (BERBEN)

== Discography ==
- 1993 : The Journey. Music by Greek composers in first recording (MUSICA VIVA)
- 2002 : Iolkos. Music by Yorgos Foudoulis inspired by ancient Greek mythology (EYF)
- 2005 : Greek Memories. Music by Greek composers (SUBWAYS)
- 2005 : Master Class. Half of a century Greek guitarists. (EROS)

== Sources ==
- Official biography on www.foudoulis.gr
