= Tolgahan Çoğulu =

Turkish musician (born 1978)

Tolgahan Çoğulu (born 1978, in Ankara, Turkey) is a Turkish classical guitarist, arranger and designer of the adjustable microtonal guitar. He built a unique repertoire of works for microtonal guitar by arranging Anatolian folk music and Ottoman maqam music and by commissioning the leading and emerging composers. In 2014, he won the 1st prize at the prestigious Margaret Guthman Musical Instrument Competition at Georgia Tech. He also won the jury award at Donizetti Classical Music Awards in 2014.

== Biography ==
Tolgahan Çoğulu began playing the guitar at the age of twelve. He graduated from Boğaziçi University Business Administration Department in 2001. He studied guitar with Ayhan Akkaya, Bekir Küçükay, Soner Egesel and Ricardo Moyano between 1997-2004. He received both Master of Music and PhD degrees on classical guitar from Istanbul Technical University’s Center for Advanced Studies in Music. His PhD thesis, ‘The Adaptation of Baglama Techniques into Classical Guitar Performance,’ was published by VDM in 2011. He founded the classical guitar duo 'Duoist' with Erhan Birol in 2007. The duo's CD, It Takes Two (Pan Classics, 2011), features a collection of world premiers commissioned by the duo over the past decade. He played with Kardeş Türküler between 2005-2007 and his book 'Temel Müzik Eğitimi' (Introduction to Music Theory and Ear Training) that he has written with Birgül Serçe was published by BGST Publishing in 2010. Çoğulu designed the movable fret Adjustable Microtonal Guitar in 2008. His first CD with microtonal guitar, Atlas, was published in 2012 by Kalan Music. He found the ‘Microtonal Guitar Duo’ in 2011 with the fretless guitar player Sinan Cem Eroğlu. Microtonal guitar duo's first CD 'Microtonal Guitar Duo' was published by Kalan Music in 2015. His microtonal guitar takes him to festivals and universities in 28 countries such as Berklee College of Music, New York City Guitar Seminar at Mannes, Iserlohn Guitar Festival, Yong Siew Toh Conservatory, GFA Convention, Mozarteum University, Sarajevo Guitar Festival, Santo Tirso Guitar Festival. Tolgahan is building a repertoire for microtonal guitar by commissioning leading and emerging composers such as William Allaudin Mathieu, Christoph Charles, Onur Türkmen, Tolga Yayalar, Johnny Reinhard, David Gerard Matthews, Tolga Zafer Özdemir, Nicola Visalli, Gabriel Malancioiu, Baxton Alexander, Sadık Uğraş Durmuş, Mutlu Torun, Tolga Tüzün, Mithatcan Öcal, Çağlayan Yıldız, Ozan Yarman. He currently teaches at the Istanbul Technical University, Turkish Music State Conservatory and Center for Advanced Studies in Music where he is working as an Associate Professor of Guitar. He got the 1st World Award in Microtonal Guitar, in the 2011 International Interartia Festival Competition and he is an honorary Member of the International Art Academy in Volos, Greece.

A microtonal guitar with a fretboard made using 3D printing and LEGO bricks, designed and constructed by Çoğulu, his son Atlas and PhD student Ruşen Can Acet, received attention from the media in 2020. The instrument was amongst the 29 finalists at the 2021 Guthman Musical Instrument Competition and received the People's Choice Award.

== List of Recordings ==
- It Takes Two – Duoist – Pan Classics, Istanbul, 2011
- Atlas – Tolgahan Çoğulu – Kalan Music, Istanbul, 2012
- Microtonal Guitar Duo - Kalan Music, Istanbul, 2015

== List of Arrangements ==
- Neşet Ertaş – Karadır Şu Bahtım Kara (Guitar-Voice)
- Anatolian Folk Song - Kız Bahçende Gül Var mı (solo guitar and two guitars)
- Kamkars – Xoş e Hewreman (two guitars)
- Ali Ekber Çiçek – Haydar Haydar (solo guitar)
- Erdal Erzincan – Anadolu (solo guitar)
- Anatolian Folk Song – Fidayda (microtonal guitar)
- Anatolian Folk Song – Yemen Türküsü (microtonal guitar)
- Aşık Veysel Şatıroğlu – Uzun İnce Bir Yoldayım (microtonal guitar)
- Frédéric Chopin – Prelude in E Minor – Op.28, No.4 (solo guitar)
- Astor Piazzolla – Soledad

== List of Publications ==
- Temel Müzik Eğitimi (Introduction to Music Theory and Ear Training) – Tolgahan Çoğulu & Birgül Serçe, BGST Publication, 2010.
- The Adaptation of Bağlama Techniques into Classical Guitar Performance, Tolgahan Çoğulu, VDM Publication, 2011.
