= Lex van Rossen Award =

The Lex van Rossen Award was an award aiming to encourage young European music photographers. Since 2008 the award was presented on an annual basis during the European music conference and showcase festival Eurosonic Noorderslag in the Dutch city of Groningen. The Award was named after pop photographer Lex van Rossen, who died on February 24, 2007, at the age of 57. The Award included a gift of 2500 euro's. The Lex van Rossen Award was initiated by Popview and ceased to exist in 2011.

== Winners ==
- 2008 - Annie Hoogendoorn (NL)
- 2009 - Tom Verbruggen (BE)
- 2010 - Graham Smith (IE)
- 2011 - Dirk Wolf (NL)

== See also ==
- List of European art awards
