= Nowotny =

Nowotny is a surname. Common in Germany and Austria, it is a variant of the Czech and Slovak surname Novotný, which means "newcomer". The name may refer to:

- Chris Nowotny (1928–1989), German photographer
- Eva Nowotny (born 1944), Austrian diplomat
- Ewald Nowotny (born 1944), Austrian politician
- George E. Nowotny (born 1932), American politician
- Helga Nowotny (born 1937), Austrian sociologist
- Jens Nowotny (born 1974), German football player
- Karl Anton Nowotny (1904–1978), Austrian ethnographer
- Rita-Maria Nowotny (1925–2000), German actress
- Robert Nowotny (born 1974), Austrian beach volleyball player
- Stan Nowotny (born 1950), Australian football player
- Walter Nowotny (1920–1944), German fighter pilot

== Fiction ==
- Waltraud Nowotny, a fictional character from Strike Witches

== Other uses ==
- Jagdgeschwader 7 Nowotny, German jet fighter wing
- Kommando Nowotny, German jet fighter group

== See also ==
- Novotný (surname)
