= Keith Salmon =

British fine artist (born 1959)

- Born: Keith Charles Salmon; 9 December 1959; Essex, England, United Kingdom
- Known for: Painting, Drawing, Sculpture
- Movement: Abstract art, Landscape art
- Awards: Jolomo Award 2009

Keith Charles Salmon (born 1959) is a British fine artist. His work is principally semi-abstract Scottish landscapes which are created based upon his experience as a hill walker. Even though he is registered blind Salmon has climbed more than one hundred of Scotland's Munros, many of which have been captured in his artworks.

== Education and experience ==
Keith Salmon was born in Essex and moved to Wales in the late 1960s. He studied for his BA in art at what is now Shrewsbury College of Arts & Technology and Falmouth School of Art between 1979 and 1983. He originally trained and worked as a sculptor, constructing pieces from steel, wood and cement fondu. On completion of his studies he moved to Newcastle-upon-Tyne in the north east of England where he set up his first studio.

In 1989, Salmon moved back to Wales and set up a new studio. Around this time his sight deteriorated very quickly and within a few years he had to stop exhibiting work. He then decided to make the most of the time he still had sight and put his efforts into drawing and painting, finding new methods using just the very limited sight he now had left.

In 1998, he moved to Irvine, Ayrshire, in Scotland and, though registered blind, had enough confidence in the new paintings and drawings he created to once again start exhibiting them.

During this time his work has developed in two different styles: organised scribbles that form his drawings, and the bolder, broad marks in oil or acrylic paintings. Most of his works are based on his experiences while out walking in the Scottish Highlands. Over the last few years he has combined the scribbled pastel line with the painted acrylic marks, stating that he is "trying to capture a little of how I experience these wonderful wild places".

Keith's art was chosen by Microsoft to participate in what the artist called "The Oregon Project", an art and sound project which used both a traditional art installation as well as a sound installation, and which was first shown at the 50th celebration of 9e2, originally created by Robert Rauschenberg and then taken to Edinburgh, Scotland.

At present Salmon keeps a studio space at Courtyard Studios in Irvine and is regularly exhibiting his work again.

== Awards ==
In 2009, Salmon won the Jolomo Award for Scottish landscape painting and was interviewed by The Scotsman, one of Scotland's top broadsheet newspapers.

== Online references ==
2009

- Keith Salmon is selected to judge the Sense Scotland 8th Helen Keller International Awards, Glasgow 2009
- Audio Interview with Keith Salmon: Insight Radio on Helen Keller Award
- Scottish Parliament congratulates artist Keith Salmon on winning Jolomo Award.
- Scottish National Heritage - Keith Salmon Exhibition
- Keith Salmon hopes for German Scholarship opportunity - Local Ayrshire News

2008

- Keith Salmon is interviewed by Blind Art - 2008
- Landscape Artist International Peer-reviewed group of international landscape artists
- Diageo Art Commission

== Exhibitions ==
2009

- Glasgow Art Fair 2009 - Keith Salmon Art Exposure Gallery

2006

- Keith Salmon Sense & Sensuality - Andrew Heiskell Braille and Talking Book Library, NYC, New York, 2006

== Prizes ==
- Jolomo Award 2009
- Rotary Club Prize, North Ayrshire Exhibition 2006
- Northern Arts Artists' Award 1984
