= Artraker =

- Formation: 2012 -->
- Founder: Manali Jagtap
- Type: Community Interest Company
- Purpose: Recognizing artworks that help shape and inspire through visual arts how people and organisations understand, engage and respond to war, violent conflict and social upheaval
- Headquarters: London
- Region served: United Kingdom
- Fields: Art
- Official language: English

Artraker is a UK-based Community Interest Company established in 2012 and the brain-child of political artist, Manali Jagtap. Artraker annually recognizes artworks that helps shape and inspire through visual arts how people and organisations understand, engage and respond to war, violent conflict and social upheaval.

== The Artraker Annual Award ==
Artraker celebrates and awards art works and art projects that make a direct positive change in countries which have experienced war, violent conflict and social upheaval.

The Artraker Awards differ from other awards such as the Turner Prize or the Deutsche Börse Photography Prize. Although like them, Artraker awards contemporary art, it is not primarily interested in the significance of the artists’ contribution to the disciplines of art or photography, but is focused instead on the ability of art to create opportunities for change and to co-create experiences of freedom even in the midst of conflict. The Artraker Annual Awards are announced during the week of International Peace Day each year and include three GBP 2500 cash prizes. The Artraker Awards are designed by London-based wood artist Sebastian Cox.

Selected by an international jury from over 300 submissions from 90 countries, South African photographer Alexia Webster received the first Artraker Annual Award on International Day of Peace (21 September 2013) from Martin Bell at a ceremony which took place at Goldsmiths, University of London. The Artraker Awards for 2014 were selected from 250 entries and included three award categories: The Artraker Award, Artraker Award for Social Impact, and Artraker Award for Innovation in Narrative (supported by a/political). The winners were San Zaw Htway (Artraker Award), Mirror Image (Artraker Award for Innovation in Narrative), and Lorena Wolffer (Artraker Award for Social Impact).

== Patrons and Partners ==
Artraker's founding patrons and partners (2012–2013) are leading peacebuilding, creative, cultural, and academic organisations that include International Conflict and Security (INCAS) Consulting Ltd, International Alert, Pulse Brands Ltd, Goldsmiths, University of London, Integrity Research and Consultancy Ltd, and Culture+Conflict.

== Name ==
The name 'Artraker' is derived from "Muckraker", a term coined by President Theodore Roosevelt in 1906. It refers to the adversarial journalistic movement that investigated and published truthful reports on social issues.

== See also ==
- List of European art awards
