= Małgorzata Chodakowska =

Polish-German sculptor

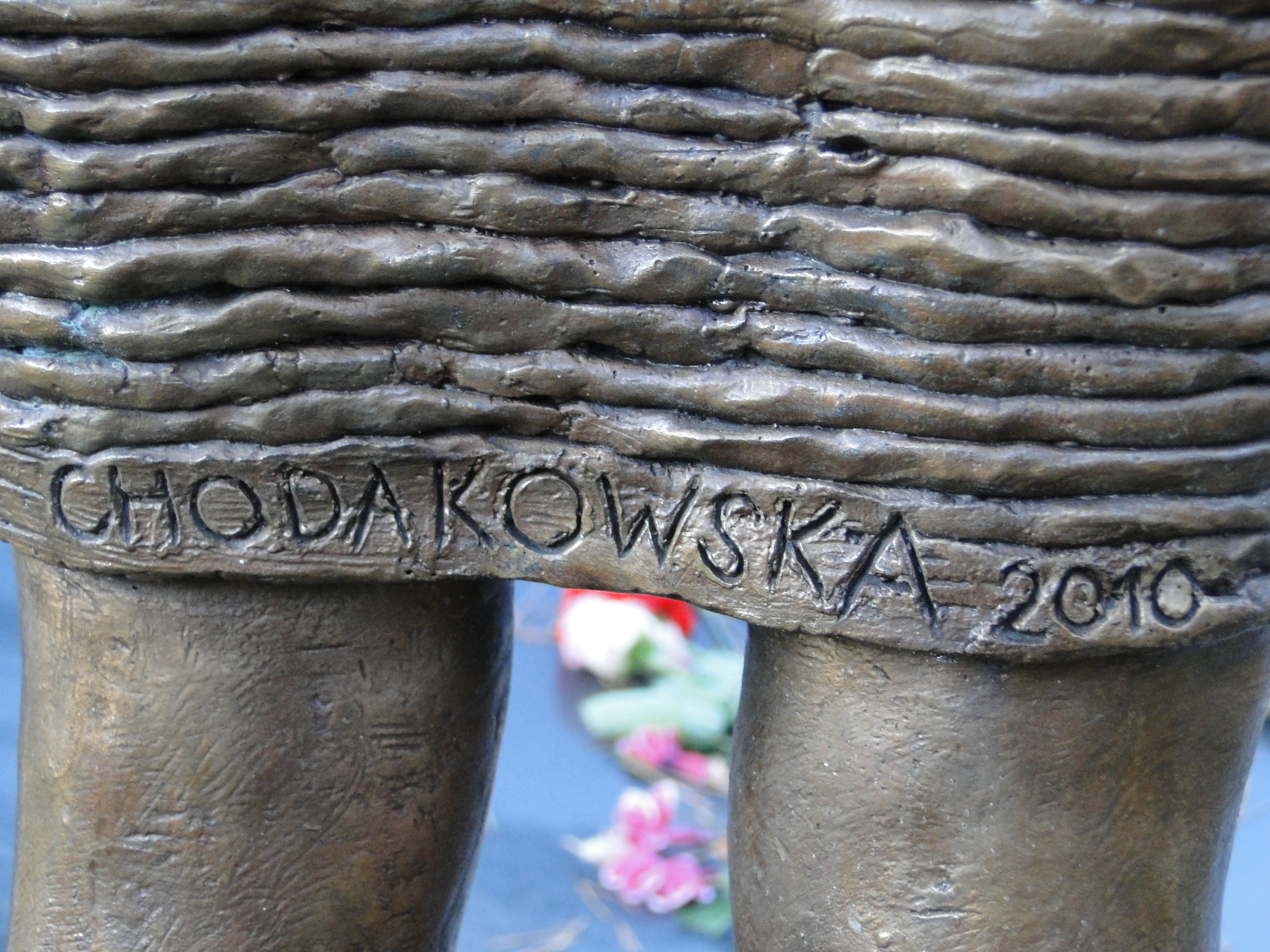
"Signature" 2010

Małgorzata Chodakowska (born 9 May 1965) is a Polish-born sculptor. She moved to Dresden in south-eastern Germany in 1991. Chodakowska and her husband have made their home in Oberpoyritz, in the countryside on the edge of Dresden since 1995; she has held German citizenship since 2018. She returns frequently to her "Stammfrauen" (loosely, "archetypal women") sculptures of women, generally naked and carved in wood, and has also produced figures for fountains and competition pieces. A striking if slightly unconventional outdoor exhibition area for many of her pieces is provided by the small vineyard on the edge of Dresden where she lives with her husband, (who in 2019 insisted to a reporter that his sculptor wife "brings more income home" than is delivered by the couple's 11 acre winery).

Chodakowska's public profile was raised by her figure of Trauerndes Mädchen am Tränenmeer (Grieving Girl at the Sea of Tears) which commemorates the bombing of the city in February 1945, and which was completed and installed at the city's Heidefriedhof cemetery (de) in 2010.

Chodakowska won the 1st World Award in Sculpture in the 2017 (February) International Interartia Festival Competition and she is also candidate honorary Member of the International Art Academy in Volos, Greece.

== Provenance and early years ==
Małgorzata Chodakowska was born and grew up in the heart of Poland, at Łódź, where between 1980 and 1985 she attended the Liceum Sztuk Plastycznyc ("Fine Arts Secondary School"). In 1985 she enrolled at the Fine Arts Academy in Warsaw where she studied sculpture with Jan Kucz. Three years later, in 1988, she moved on again, this time to the Academy of Visual Arts in Vienna, to progress her studies further. Her prize-winning dissertation, which she submitted in 1991, was supervised by Bruno Gironcoli.

== Klaus and wine ==
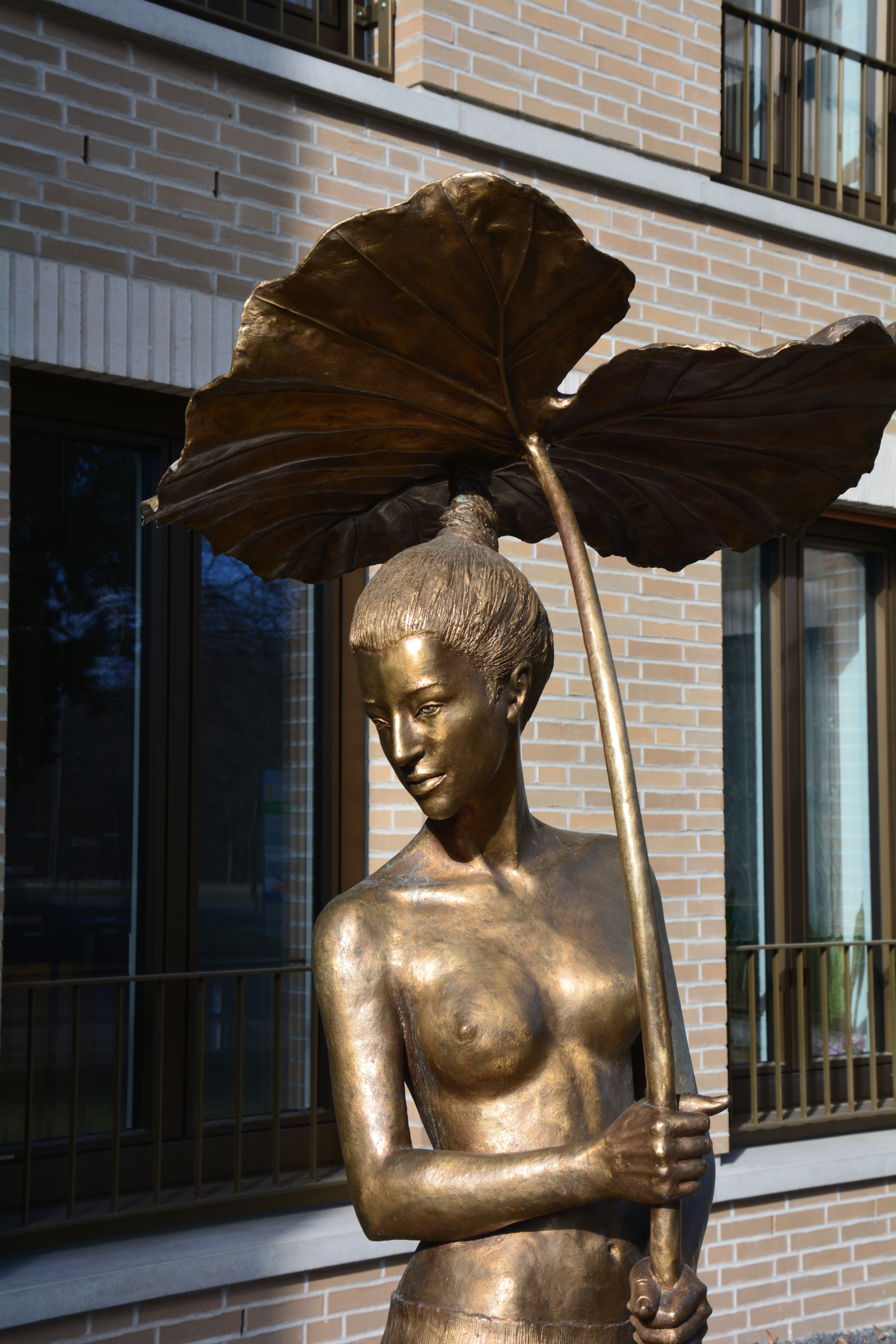
Mädchen mit Blatt II (Girl with leaf) Brunnenfigur (Fountain figure) Friedrich Liszt Str. 2, Dresden Małgorzata Chodakowska, 2016

In September 1989 Małgorzata Chodakowska took a hiking trip in the Tatra Mountains (Polish side) with a couple of friends. While walking one day the girls fell into conversation with a solitary East German hiker. Klaus Zimmerling was a mechanical-electrical engineer from the Wachwitz (de) quarter of Dresden. (It later turned out that Zimmerling was a frustrated engineer, but a passionate hobby-winemaker.) That evening they agreed to team up for the final part of their break and at the end of the trip Chodakowska and Zimmerling exchanged addresses. Two weeks later she arrived at Dresden on the train from Warsaw to be met by Klaus clutching a bunch of flowers and solemnly unrolling a red carpet across the platform: they were evidently in love. Significant travel restrictions were still in force between central European countries in the "Soviet Empire", but 1989/90 was a period of massive and lasting social and political change. By the end of 1990 Chodakowska had joined her lover in Dresden and the couple were married. At this point, however, Małgorzata Chodakowska still had not completed her course at the Academy in Vienna. Street protestors had breached the Berlin Wall in November 1989, however, and it became clear, after East Berliners—some exultant and others merely intrigued—streamed past bemused border guards, that neither the watching Soviet soldiers nor their East German proxies had received orders to kill. There would be no repeat of 1953. Long-standing restrictions on foreign travel rapidly disappeared and Zimmerling was able to accompany his bride to Austria where she completed her artistic studies in Vienna and he undertook a twelve-month internship on an organic winery up-river at Wachau.

== The business ==
Since 1991 Chodakowska has lived with her husband in Dresden and supported herself as a freelance sculptor. It was also in 1991 that she was accepted for membership of the Saxon Artists' Association (Sächsische Künstlerbund). At this point she was still living at Meißner Landstraße 141, close to the river and a short distance to the west of the city centre. In 1992 Zimmerling purchased his vineyard and over the next few years he was able to add to it. In 1995 they had acquired an old farmhouse on the eastern side of the city in Pillnitz near the eponymous Schloss, and positioned between the old royal vineyard formerly attached to the Schloss and the little vineyard the two of them had been managing together: the farmhouse became the couple's new home and business premises, while the vineyard became the backdrop for some of Chodakowska's sculptures. Over time more of her pieces have been erected in public places nearby. Images of her sculptures also appear on the labels of the wine bottles.

Chodakowska states that inspiration for her sculpture comes from travel. A visit to Portugal inspired her oak-wood sculpture "Portugiesischer Schönling" (loosely, "little Portuguese beauty"). She says that another trip, this time to Egypt in 1996, enabled her to lose her reticence over working with gold. Visiting Cambodia in 2000, she was inspired by Khmer carved stone temple dancers that "revealed the embodiment of good and evil bound together in ecstatic unison". Małgorzata Chodakowska's work is both attractive and skilfully promoted. She explained to an interviewer that in 2005 she reached the point that she no longer had to sell everything that she could produce to put food on the table. Since then she has generally retained her original hardwood sculptures, often displaying them on the family vineyard, while selling only the bronze castings produced from them. One speciality is her so-called "water sculptures" or "fountain figures" which combine an attractive (normally) female figure with a fountain. One (admittedly extreme) example of Chodakowska's commercial success was reported in 2010 when "Überfluss" ("Abundance"), a 1.80-meter high bronze fountain figure completed in 2009, was sold to a businessman for €50,000.

== Method ==
As a student at Łódź and later at Vienna, Malgorzata Chodakowska took the opportunity to work with a number of different themes and techniques. In the end she decided to concentrate on presentations of the human form. She told an interviewer in 2008, "Working with the human form enables me to feel as close as possible to the figure I am working on, and so I have the feeling that this is the form I can best compose sculpturally". (Note: "Wenn ich figürlich arbeite, fühle ich mich am nächsten bei der Form und habe den Eindruck, dass ich sie so am besten formulieren kann.") Her recurring theme is the so-called "Stammfrau" (loosely, "archetypal woman"), usually carved from wood to give a life-sized or slightly larger than life-sized form. She generally uses wood from uprooted trees, provided either by forestry authorities or by friends and acquaintances. She prefers to work with harder woods, often from fruit trees: linden, Pear wood, cherry wood, oak, tulip tree and, since 2010, ash. Depending on the hardness of the wood and the complexity of the design, a sculpture typically takes Chodakowska three or four months to carve. She prefers harder woods because, she says, she needs the "resistance of the wood" for her work. Her favourite timber variety is oak.

Normally she starts by sketching a series of images for a sculpture with the help of a life model and using photographs of her model. The front view and profile sketches are then applied directly to the selected block of wood which is cut roughly to shape using a hammer and chisel. The finer image then "emerges" from the roughly cut tree trunk, with the human figure and the base forming a single block, the girth of the figure being constrained by the original diameter of the trunk selected: "For the 'Fata Morgana' an oak [trunk] with a 1.20m diameter was necessary". (Note: "Für die Fata Morgana ... war eine Esche mit dem Durchmesser von 1,20 Meter nötig.") Smaller parts are rarely added.

During her earlier period Chodakowska left her figures as simple unenhanced wood images, often of nudes. Over time she developed an appreciation that colour can bring a new dimension, and make the surfaces appear more reminiscent of real human skin, so that her more recent images are usually "partly clothed", often with acrylic paint. Emphasis is placed on the face and on the garment. "You can use light acrylic paint to give the impression of clothing, which nevertheless comes with a diaphanous quality that does little to conceal the body". (Note: "Durch leichte Acrylfarben erzeugt sie den Eindruck von Kleidern, die gleichwohl durch ihre Transparenz den Körper kaum verhüllen.") The art historian Karin Weber comments that the resulting sculpted closely fitting dresses come across as a contemporary interpretation of the "wetlook style" ("nassen Stil") familiar to specialist scholars familiar with the sculpture of classical Greece. Since a visit to Egypt in 1996 Chodakowska has also worked with gold surfacing as an additional expressive device. Some of her sculptures are coated with a final glaze made of beeswax, linseed oil and turpentine, which enhances the clarity of the grain in the wood.

Along with her "Stammfrauen" (loosely, "archetypal women"), who are mostly modeled on dancers, Chodakowska has also sculpted a few "Stammmänner", and some couples, representations of children and busts. She explains her preference for sculpting with wood on the grounds that this material "communicates warmth. It is [therefore] especially suitable for representing people". (Note: "Wärme aus[strahlt]. Das Material ist am ehesten geeignet, Menschen darzustellen".) Wood, "with its grained texture, [calls to mind] the tendons and veins in the human body". (Note: "[Holz,] mit seiner Maserung [erinnert sich] an das Netz der Adern und Sehnen im menschlichen Körper".)

During the 1990s Chodakowska went through several years of working with tin and glass, notably with her "Tänzerin" ("Dancing girl", 1993) figure, "Glasmenagerie" (1994) and "Liebespaar" ("Lovers", 1994) which combines both glass and tin. Since the mid-1990s she has, from time to time, worked in bronze, a necessary departure from her preference for working with wood when producing her hallmark fountain figures for outdoor display.
