= Jolomo Award =

The Jolomo Bank of Scotland Award, founded in 2007 by the Scottish landscape artist John Lowrie Morrison, is the largest arts award in Scotland and the UK's largest privately funded arts award, with a biennial prize currently (2011) of £25,000 for the winner.

"The Awards seek to recognise young and emerging artists who are moving Scottish landscape painting forward, and support them in their development."

== 2007 Award ==
First Prize: Anna King – Paintings in oil and pencil on paper and board. A "painter of quarries and wastelands, an original, modern voice in landscape art." - prize of £20,000.

Runners up: Helen Glassford (£4,000), Rebecca Firth (£3,000) and Ingrid Fraser (£3,000)

== 2009 Award ==
First Prize: Keith Salmon – Paintings in oil and acrylic based on his experiences as a hill walker and Monro climber. Prize £20,000.

Runners up: Toby Cooke (£5,000), Jack Frame (£2,500) and Alastair Strachan (£2,500).

== 2011 Award ==
First Prize: Calum McClure (£25,000)

== 2013 Award ==
First Prize: Dawnne McGeachy (£25,000)

Runners up: Ruth Nicol (£6,000), Amy Dennis (£4,000)

== Is it an Anti Turner Prize? ==
This is what Jolomo has to say in a newspaper interview on the subject.

“The brutal truth is that in 10 or 20 years’ time, the ranks of Scotland’s landscape painters, myself included, will be dead. We’re a bit like original Gaelic-speakers, a dying breed.
“There may be arguments for and against landscape painting, and for or against conceptual Charles Saatchi art, I'm just not interested in the arguments, not in the least. I love Scottish landscape painting and I want to see it live on. Unmade beds and bananas on a windowsill? I just don’t get it.”

== See also ==
- List of European art awards
