= Richard Ansett =

English photographer (born 1966)

Richard Ansett (born 20 February 1966) is a photographer known for his provocative images. His images are in permanent collections of the National Portrait Gallery, London, Library and Archives Canada, and the Smithsonian Institution. His images have been part of major collaborative exhibitions. He won the overall prize for photography at the Arte Laguna Prize 12/13, 1st prize for fine art documentary at Grand Prix de la Decouverte 2013 and received the gold award at Prix de la Photographie'11.

== Early work ==
Ansett's solo exhibition in 2002, Ron & Roger, consisted of a series of portraits of the first same sex couples to participate in the London Partnership Register in their home environments. The images were exhibited at The Candid Arts Trust and at the Tate Modern turbine hall to celebrate GLA Londoner's Day in 2002; the series is now part of the Hall–Carpenter Archives at the London School of Economics. Image 'Chris & David' from the series was selected for the John Kobal Award exhibition at the National Portrait Gallery, London in 2002. Inspired by the Arnolfini Marriage, which at the time was considered as a record of a clandestine betrothal; the images represented a union that was not yet recognised by law and society.

== Awards ==
- Gold award at Prix de la Photographie'11, Px3
- Overall prize for photography at the Arte Laguna Prize 12/13
- 1st prize for fine art documentary at Grand Prix de la Decouverte 2013

== Collections ==
Ansett's work is held in the following permanent collections:

- National Portrait Gallery, London
- Library and Archives Canada
- Bibliothèque Nationale de France
- Smithsonian Institution
