= Chris Nowotny =

German photographer

Chris Nowotny (April 19, 1928 – March 18, 1989) was a German photographer known for her highly stylized black and white portraits of actors, photographs of landscape, as well as portraits of children and babies.

== Biography ==
Nowotny was born and grew up until her teenage years in Königsberg in the former German province of East-Prussia (today better known as Kaliningrad, Russia). During the invasion of the Red Army towards Königsberg she fled to Wilhelmshaven in the North of Germany with her mother. As a child of a midwife and a policeman she had no possibility to visit a university to study arts and therefore decided to learn the artisanry of a photographer. After a three-year traineeship at Oldenburg, Germany, she traveled to numerous places in Southern Germany, Austria and Switzerland to work as a portrait photographer. Some years later she worked as a landscape photographer and published several books. In 1953–1955 she was at the Vienna Higher Graphical Academy to successfully master her examination for the grade of master in photography.

In 1967 she gave birth to her son Niki, who became an audio-book narrator and journalist.

From the end of the 1960s on Chris Nowotny worked as a still photographer for the Munich theaters and as a portrait photographer for many international TV stars and actors (e.g. Curd Jürgens, Heinz Rühmann, Telly Savalas, and Mel Ferrer). After 1977 she specialized in portraits of children and babies for advertising and international photo agencies (e.g. Tony Stone Worldwide). Nowotny died on March 18, 1989, in Berg, Upper Bavaria at Lake Starnberg, near Munich from bowel cancer; she was 60 years old. In memory of her 80th birthday and the 850th anniversary of the city of Munich a Munich-based publishing company Brainscript published a book 'Munich: 50 Years of her best shots from Munich. The book sold out within four weeks.

== Technique ==
Nowotny took her first photographs with a Leica Camera. Later on she used Rollei cameras for decades. In the early 1970s, she acquired a Hasselblad medium-format camera. She loved working in her home-based studio in Munich (and from 1985 to 1986 in Zurich, Switzerland), and worked mainly during nighttimes in her own darkroom to get out most of her negatives.

== Literature ==
- Holst, Nowotny: Munich, London 1964
- Schreiber, Nowotny: Wien, Bern 1974
- Schreiber: Salzburg und Salzburger Land, Bern 1975
- Schreiber: Das Schiff aus Stein - Venedig und die Venezianer, Munich 1979
- Nowotny, Behr: "München: 50 Jahre in Bildern - Munich: 50 years in pictures: Eine Liebeserklärung an eine Stadt. Fotografien von Mutter und Sohn. - A declaration of love to a city. Photography by mother and son.", Munich 2010
- Rotary International: "Katalog Charity Art Auction of Rotary Club Munich International", Munich 2014
