= Karlskoga Nobel Art scholarship =

The Karlskoga Nobel Art Scholarship is an annual scholarship given to artists in memory of the Swedish inventor Alfred Nobel. In 1996 a Swedish artist by the name of Göran Persson created a portfolio of graphics describing Nobel's life in Karlskoga, Sweden. Proceeds from the sales of the portfolio were used as the initial fund for the scholarship.

A project of the Karlskoga Municipality, the scholarship is open to all active Swedish artists with preference given to those working in graphics. Founded in 1996, the first Karlskoga Nobel Art Scholarship award was given on December 10 of the same year. Recipients of the scholarship have their works selected by a jury.

== See also ==
- List of European art awards
