= Jeanne Novotny =

Jeanne Novotny is Dean and Professor at the Fairfield University School of Nursing located in Fairfield, Connecticut. Novotny was named a 2002 Fellow of the American Academy of Nursing in recognition of her outstanding contributions to nursing. She received two Book of the Year Awards from the American Journal of Nursing for Distance Education in Nursing (Springer Publishing Company; 2nd edition, 2005) and The Nuts and Bolts of Teaching Nursing (Springer Publishing Company; 3rd Edition, 2006).

== Career ==
Prior to arriving at Fairfield University, Novotny was the associate dean for academic programs at the Frances Payne Bolton School of Nursing, Case Western Reserve University and was interim director of the World Health Organization Collaborating Center, consulting on 16 health-related initiatives in eight countries and the U.S.

== Education ==
Novotny received her bachelor's and Master of Science degrees in nursing from Ohio State University and her Ph.D. from Kent State University.
