= Farm Cultural Park =

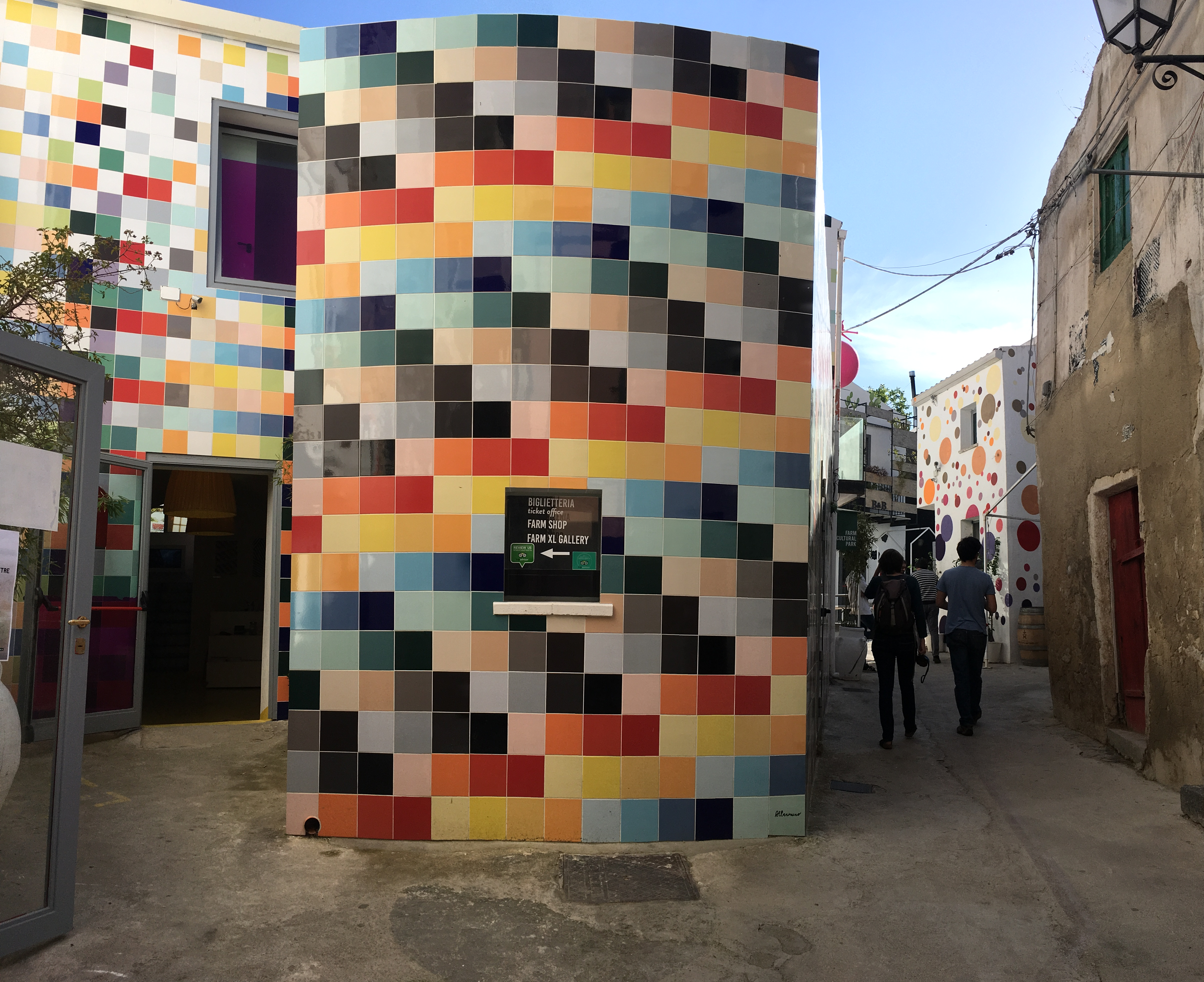
- Location: Italy
- Coordinates: 37°18′48″N 13°39′30″E
- Visitors: 10,000 (2012)
- Website: www.farmculturalpark.com
- Location of Farm Cultural Park

Farm Cultural Park is an art gallery and exhibition space located in Favara, Sicily in Italy.

== History ==
Farm Cultural Park opened in 2010, when Andrea Bartoli and his wife Florinda Saieva bought several buildings in the semi-abandoned city center of Favara and renovated them completely, creating a cultural center that now hosts expositions, exhibitions by international and local artists, politically charged artwork, along with shops, a garden bar, cultural events, talks, screenings and workshops.

The main aim of the project is to save the old center of Favara and give the city, previously known mostly for its general decrepitude and for having one of Italy's highest unemployment rates, by giving it a new life through art.

Since its opening in 2010, the Farm Cultural Park already attracted tourists from all over the world.

"We were tired of always having to go to places like New York or London to see anything interesting," he says. "We wanted to find a way to transform and improve the area we were living in, for ourselves but also for our kids."

The project has brought a whole new breath of life to Favara, previously known mostly for its general decrepitude and for having one of Italy's highest unemployment rates. Several elderly local women, who had clung to their homes in the semi-abandoned town centre, now live amongst the exhibition spaces, happy to have company and to once again reside in a neighbourhood that is safe and alive. Meanwhile, a growing number of local youth have come to volunteer at the project.
