= David Jan Novotný =

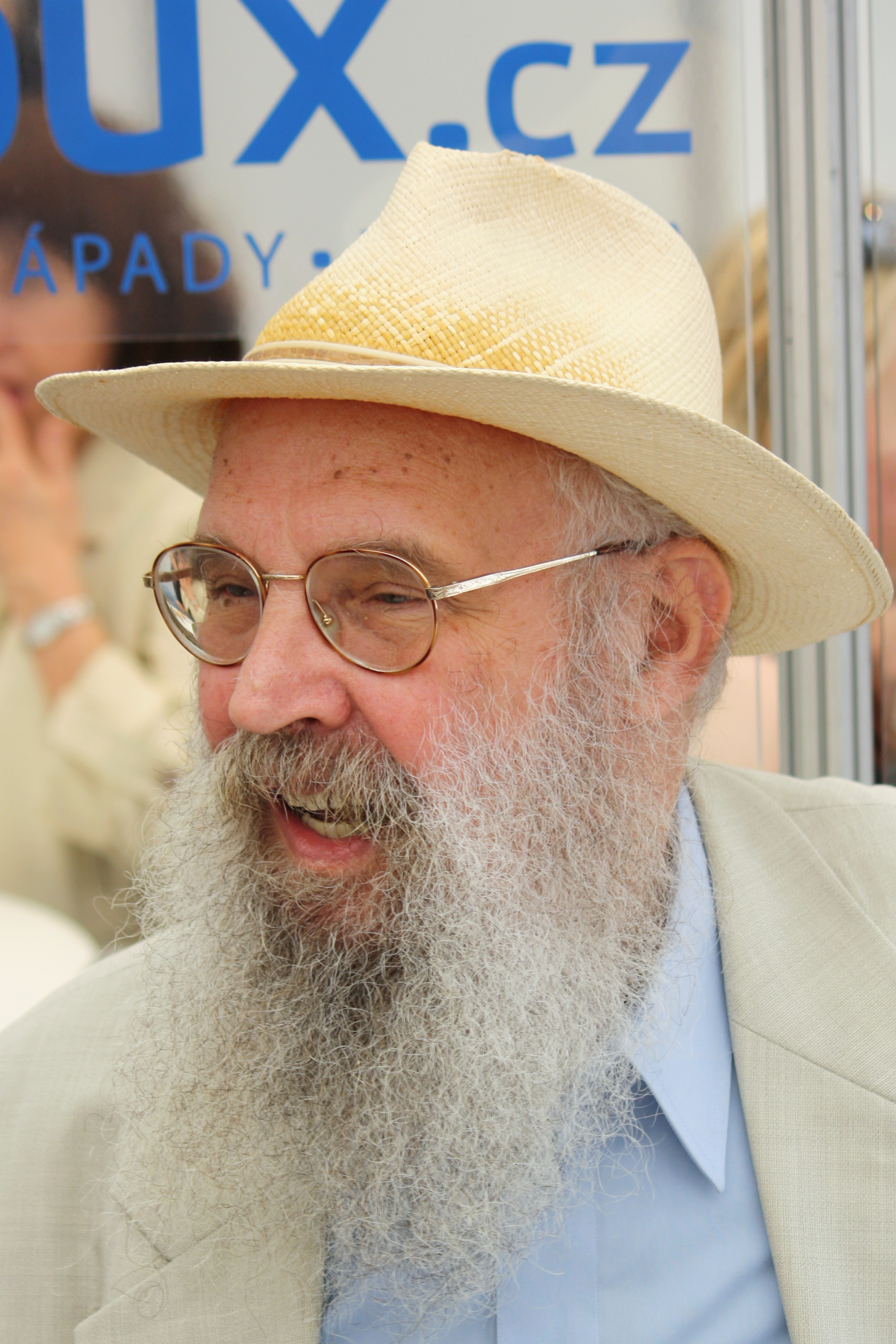
- Jan Novotný in 2011
- Born: 28 November 1947 (age 77); Prague

David Jan Novotný (born 28 November 1947), also known as Samuel Neumann, is a Czech scriptwriter, dramaturge, poet, writer, and academic.

== Early life and education ==
David Jan Novotný was born in Prague on 28 November 1947. He is the grandson of Protestant theologian and academic Adolf Novotný (1891–1968), who authored the Bible Dictionary (Biblického slovníku). His father, Jan Blahoslav Novotný (1917–1983) was a graphic artist.

Novotny attended SVVŠ high school in Prague from 1963 to 1966. After this he had various jobs, including work as a cleaner in the theatre, assistant production manager and assistant camera operator at Short Film Prague, and assistant production manager at Barrandov Studios. He served in the military from 1968 to 1970 in Kroměříž, and worked at a printing firm from 1970 to 1971.

In 1971-1976 Novotný studied at the Film and TV School of The Academy of Performing Arts in Prague (FAMU), in the department of screenwriting and dramaturgy.

== Career ==
In 1977-1990 Novotný was a scriptwriter at Barrandov Studios.

In 1990 he became an assistant in the FAMU Department of Scriptwriting and Dramaturgy, and worked as a lecturer.

In 1997 he received his higher doctorate, and an associate professorship. He also became vice-dean for science and pedagogical affairs, joined the scientific council of FAMU, and became deputy chairman of the council for PhD study. In 1997 he received his habilitation in the disciplines of dramaturgy and scriptwriting.

In 2001 he was made professor of scriptwriting and dramaturgy, and in 2002 was nominated for a professorship at the department of journalism at Charles University in Prague. From 2000 to 2004 he was professor of cinema studies in the foreign students program at FAMU. In 2004-2007 he was the first rector of the Film Academy of Miroslav Ondříček in Písek.

From 2008 he taught at the Josef Škvorecký Literary Academy in Prague. From 2009 to 2010, he worked as the dramaturg of production company ArtForum 21, and in 2010 became vice-rector for scientific activities of the Literary Academy.

=== Writing ===
In 1965, Novotný made his debut as a poet with Vlasta. He later published short stories, prose, poems, and articles, in Literární měsnik and Tvorba a Kmeni, and many other magazines. Some of his writings were based on his scripts. He participated in a number of film works as a dramaturg. He sometimes wrote under the pen name Samuel Neumann. His novels include Vasarely's Cross (Vasarelyho kříž, 2007); Sidra Noach (2010), which won a major literary prize; Dybuk and the Devil (2017); Gilgul (2013); Tales from the Emmental (2017); Reflections on Myth (2014); and Confession of an StB Agent (2016).
