= Jan Novotný (footballer) =

Czech footballer

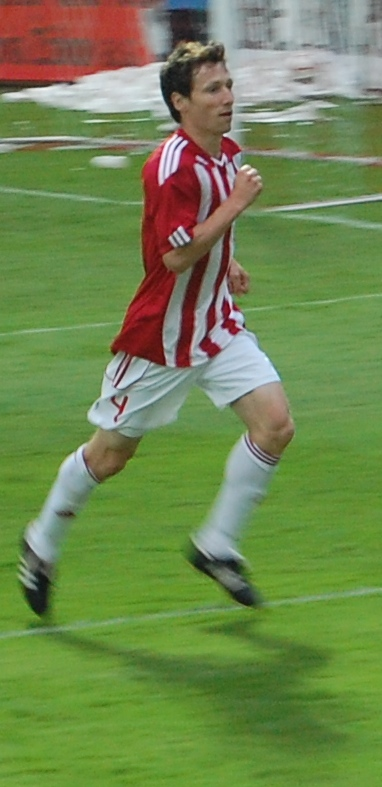

Personal information
- Date of birth: 15 April 1982 (age 44)
- Place of birth: Czechoslovakia
- Height: 1.74 m (5 ft 8 1/2 in)
- Position: Midfielder

Team information
- Current team: FK Kolín

Senior career*
Years	Team	Apps	(Gls)
2001–2011	FK Viktoria Žižkov	66	(5)
2009	→ FK Bohemians Prague (Střížkov) (loan)	10	(0)
2010	→ SK Kladno (loan)	10	(1)
2011–	FK Kolín		
- * Club domestic league appearances and goals as of 30 June 2011

Jan Novotný (born 15 April 1982) is a professional Czech football player who played in the Gambrinus liga for clubs including FK Viktoria Žižkov, FK Bohemians Prague (Střížkov) and SK Kladno.
