= Émilie Brout & Maxime Marion =

Franco-Luxembourgish artist duo

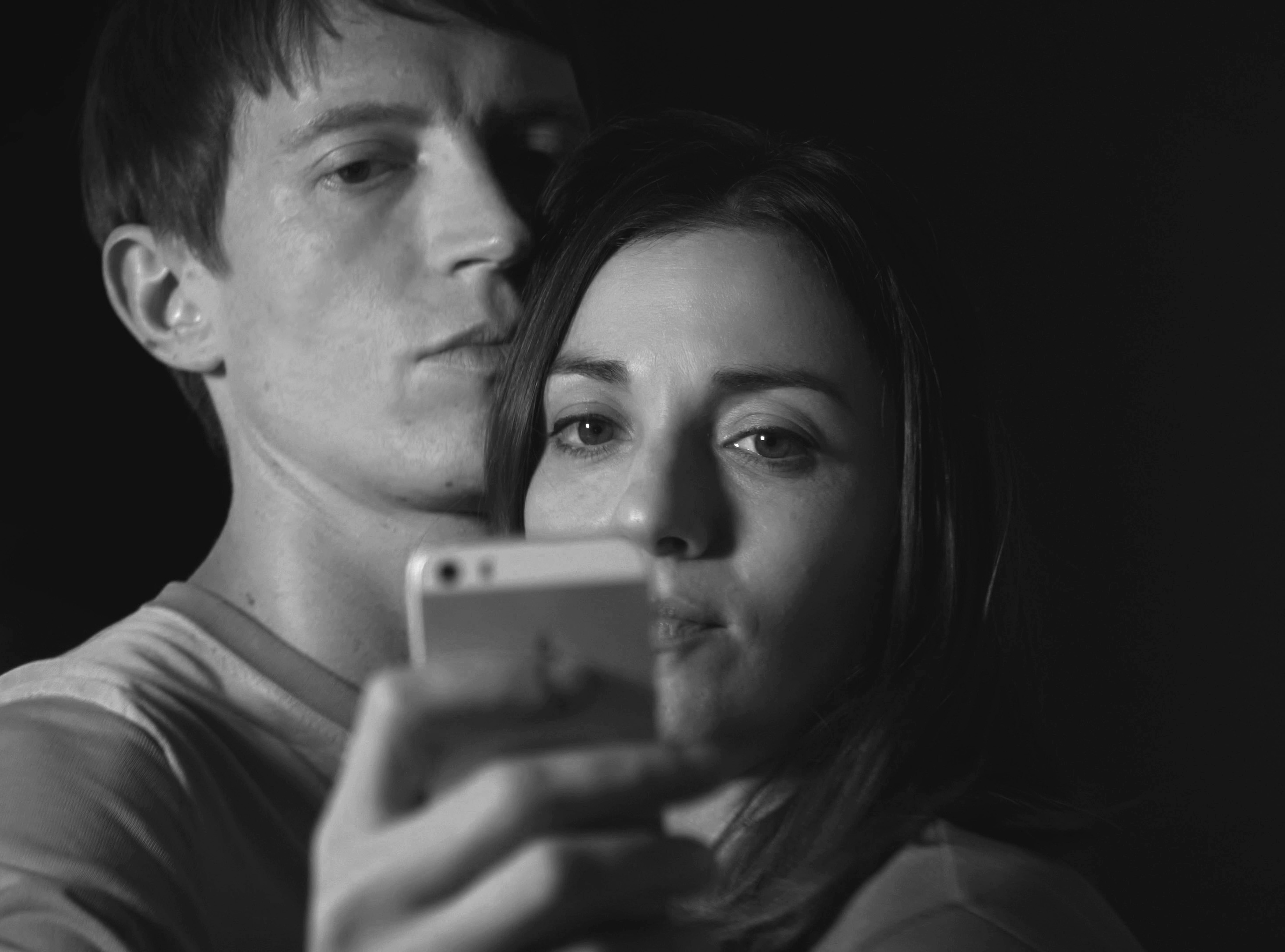
- Émilie Brout & Maxime Marion, 2021
- Born: 1984 (Brout) / 1982 (Marion)
- Education: École nationale supérieure des arts décoratifs, Paris
- Known for: Visual arts, Video art, Net art
- Website: eb-mm.net

Émilie Brout & Maxime Marion (born 1984 and 1982) are a duo of French and Luxembourgish contemporary visual artists and video artists.

== Biography ==
Émilie Brout and Maxime Marion began their collaboration while studying at the École nationale supérieure des arts décoratifs in Paris.

Their work has entered collections such as the Centre Pompidou and several FRACs (Fonds régional d'art contemporain) in France, and has been widely covered by media such as Zérodeux, Le Monde, Arte, Les Inrocks, Libération, Beaux-Arts, Frieze, Observer and BBC.

They have exhibited internationally at the KW Institute for Contemporary Art (Berlin), the Centre Pompidou (Paris), Casino Luxembourg, BPS22 (Charleroi), MAC VAL (Vitry-sur-Seine), as well as solo exhibitions at La Chaufferie (HEAR, Strasbourg), Villa du Parc (Annemasse), 22,48 m² (Paris) and Steve Turner (Los Angeles).

== Artistic practice ==
Their works explore the uses, languages and culture of the Internet era, in particular the circulation of online images and their transformation into narratives. Through video, installation and web-based practices, they examine the boundaries between artworks and consumer products, between lived reality and its idealized representation.
