= Trieste Contemporanea =

Trieste Contemporanea is a cultural centre based in Trieste (Italy). Founded as a committee in 1995, it carries out a prevalent research activity into the field of Central Eastern European contemporary visual arts. The Centre dedicates to the artistic and curatorial practices of this European area exhibitions, events, conferences and workshops, editorial productions, international special projects and some recurring initiatives including the CEI Venice Forum for Contemporary Art Curators (since 2003, a co-production with the Central European Initiative), the Trieste Contemporanea International Design Competition (founded in 1995 by Gillo Dorfles), the Young European Artist Trieste Contemporanea Award (since 1999, for artists under 30, active in the fields of theatre, visual arts and information technology).

The Trieste Contemporanea library (specialized in European art of the twentieth and twenty-first centuries and dedicated to Franco Jesurun) is part of the Italian National Library Service. The centre has recently been recognised by the Italian Ministry of Cultural Heritage (MiBACT) as a luogo del contemporaneo (Italian contemporary art venue).
