= Mark Novotny =

American physicist

Mark A. Novotny is an American physicist currently a W. L. Giles Distinguished Professor at Mississippi State University, and an Elected Fellow of the American Association for the Advancement of Science and also American Physical Society for "original algorithm development and applications of computational statistical mechanics to equilibrium and non-equilibrium problems in condensed-matter physics and materials science".
