= Victoria Yakusha =

Ukrainian architect, designer and artist

- Вікторія Валеріївна Якуша
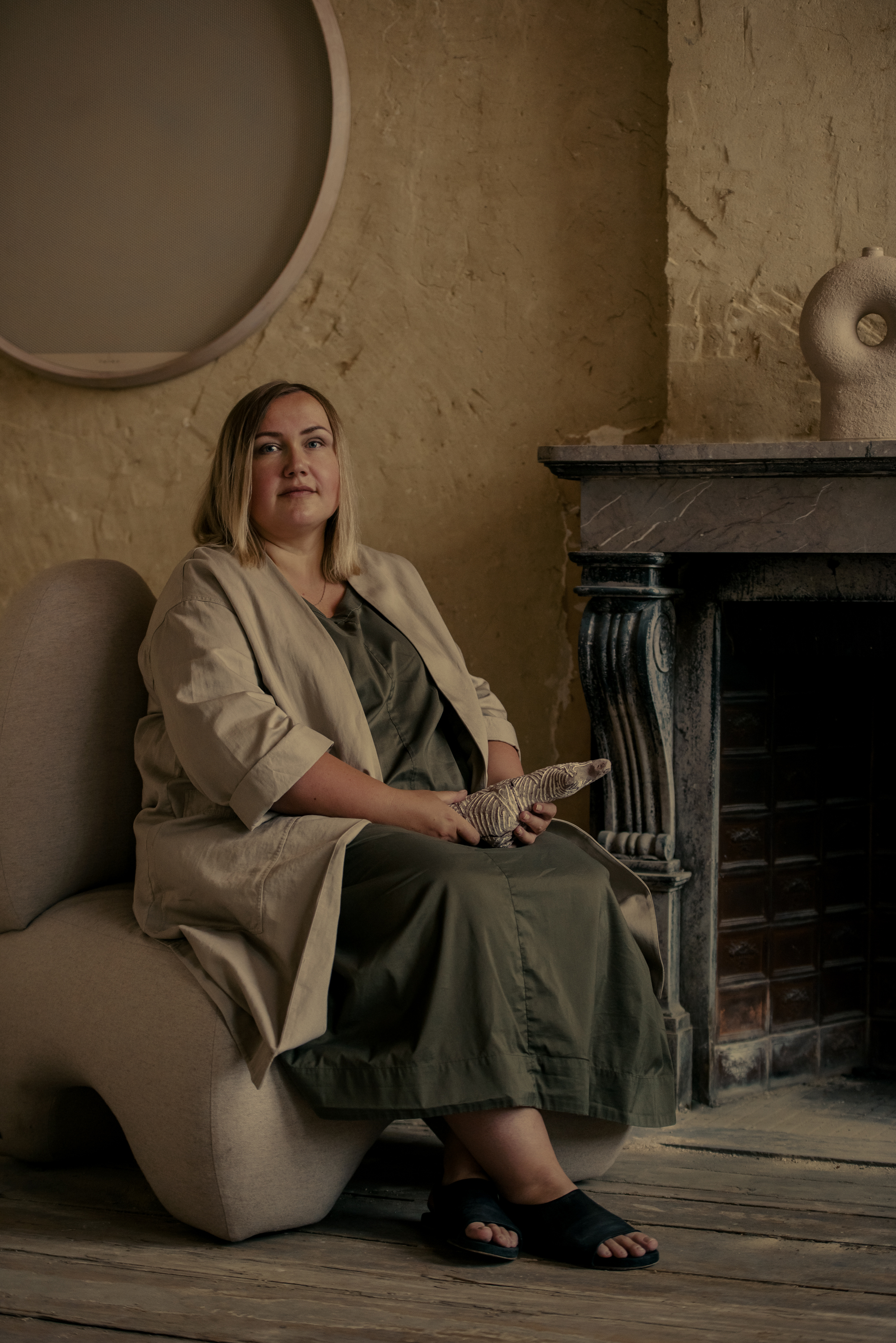
- Born: 1982 (age 43–44); Dnipropetrovsk, Ukrainian SSR, Soviet Union
- Education: Institut National des Sciences Appliquées (INSA), France
- Occupations: architect, designer, artist

Victoria Yakusha (Ukrainian: Вікторія Валеріївна Якуша) is a Ukrainian architect, designer, and artist. She is a founder of YAKUSHA architecture studio and FAINA brand. Yakusha's designs have been exhibited at Design Miami in Miami and Basel, Collectible, Venice Biennale, Paris Design Week, Milan Design Week, etc.

In 2019, Victoria Yakusha was named Designer of the Year by Elle Decoration Awards and received the Award for Design of the Year.

In 2024, Victoria Yakusha was recognized as one of the top 50 most influential women globally in the field of architecture and design, according to Dezeen.

== Early life and education ==
Victoria Yakusha was born in 1982 in Dnipro, Ukraine. She earned an architectural degree at Prydniprovska State Academy of Civil Engineering and Architecture, Ukraine and completed her studies at the Institut National des Sciences Appliquées (INSA), France.

== Career ==
In 2006, Victoria Yakusha founded a multidisciplinary design studio Yakusha, which works in the field of architecture, interior design, product design, and creative direction.

In 2014, she founded a design brand called FAINA (which means 'sweet' or 'beautiful' in Ukrainian) that produces handmade furniture and objects using traditional Ukrainian craft techniques and local materials such as clay, wood, willow and flax in collaboration with local artisans whose crafts are at risk of dying out due to lack of interest and low profitability. The collections includes furniture, decor, lighting, and home fragrances released two times per year and are present in 44 countries worldwide.

Victoria Yakusha developed her signature material, ZTISTA (Ukrainian: made of dough), a fully compostable blend of cellulose, clay, flax fiber, wood chips, and biopolymer coating and created a collection made of this material in 2018.

In 2019, she launched Ya Vsesvit in Kyiv, a collaborative space for creatives, encompassing a studio, a Faina showroom and a lecture room for events. It was followed by the opening of Faina House, a second showroom, in Brussels in 2020, where Yakusha is based as of 2023.

In 2021, she opened FAINA Gallery of Ukrainian design in Antwerp, Belgium. FAINA was highlighted as the best emerging design studio by the Dezeen Awards Public Vote in 2019.

In 2024, Dezeen recognized Victoria Yakusha as one of the top 50 most influential women globally in the field of architecture and design.

== Public activities ==
Victoria Yakusha's brand FAINA is focused on the preservation of Ukrainian cultural heritage in contemporary design. Her "The Land of Light" collection, created as a response to war and violence in Ukraine and in other countries in the world, involved ancient Ukrainian craft "valkuvannya" a technique typically used for wall finishing. Her "Zemlia" tapestry, presented at the London Design Biennale, was created in collaboration with the masters of the ancient craft of "bed-making" from the Carpathian Mountains.

In 2022, the Yakusha studio joined the program for the restoration of affected cities in Ukraine, developing a concept for the development and reconstruction of Chernihiv.

Victoria Yakusha also presented the concept of the Maria Prymachenko Museum Complex, titled The Path of Maria. This concept was showcased at an exhibition of the artist's works at Saatchi Gallery in London and the Ukrainian House in September 2022.

== Exhibitions ==
- 2020 – Stockholm Design Week, Stockholm
- 2022 – Designblok, St. Gabriel, Prague
- 2022 – Design Miami/Basel, Miami

== Awards ==
- 2012 – International Architectural Awards (Winner in the residential interior category)
- 2015 – Interyear (Winner in the interior design category)
- 2018 – Interior Of The Year, Ukraine (Winner in the office category, Ya Vsevsit project)
- 2019 – Artspace Award (The best interior design of offices and cultural spaces)
- 2021 – DEZEEN AWARDS (The best interior in the Bars & Restaurants category)
- 2022 – Design Miami/Basel (The best Curio Show of the Year, FAINA Gallery)
