= Artmajeur =

Online art gallery based in France

- Company type: Online Art Gallery
- Industry: Art Market
- Founded: 2000 in Montpellier, France
- Headquarters: France
- Website: www.artmajeur.com

Artmajeur is an online art gallery based in Montpellier, France and founded in 2000. It allows artists to present original paintings, sculptures, drawings, photographies, and prints.

== History ==
Artmajeur was founded in 2000 by Samuel Charmetant and Yann Sarazin, then computer sciences students in University of Montpellier. The platform maintains an offline presence in the form of a quarterly Art Magazine, and by participating to international art fairs.

In 2015, Artmajeur launched a virtual gallery in a 3D visualization of the Place Vendôme (Paris).

During the COVID-19 lockdown, Artmajeur promoted #ArtistSupportPledge campaign on social media.

In 2021, Samuel Charmetant was appointed to the rank of Knight of Ordre national du Mérite (France) for founding the platform.

Artmajeur presents artists from 200 countries, and is available in several languages, including Chinese and Russian.

== Artists ==
The platform presents emerging and well-known artists, including:

- Shepart Fairey (Obey), Salvador Dalí, Takashi Murakami, Reginald Gray, David Gerstein, Leonid Afremov, Jean Humbert Salvoldeli.

== See also ==
Art market

Contemporary art gallery

E-commerce
