= International Interartia Festival =

Annual international art festival that takes place in Volos, Greece

Interartia (Greek: Παγκόσμιο Φεστιβάλ τεχνών) is an annual international art festival that takes place in Volos, Greece. It was organized for the first time in 2007.

Interartia is organized by the Foudoulis Conservatory and the International Art Society & Academy. Festival's competitions cover all sectors and all categories of artistic creation and among others, it includes the International Music Competitions as well as the Artists of the Year Competition (artists who gain the first prize or the World Award in all competitions held within the framework of the present Interartia (photography, art, music, video, movie, etc.), may participate.

Since its inception the festival awarded and collaborated with a number of famous and notable artists including Martha Argerich (the winner of the Japanese Premium Imperiale and 3 Grammy awards), Éric Pénicaud, Nobuyuki Tsujii, The Quartetto di Cremona, Peter Bence (Guinness World Record - breaking pianist with "the fastest fingers on the planet"), Małgorzata Chodakowska, Fraguial Francisco Guilherme de Almeida Jesus, Alondra de la Parra (the current Music Director of the Queensland Symphony Orchestra), Marco Minnemann, Thelxis Theohari,Tolgahan Çoğulu, Sungha Jung, Silesian Guitar Octet, Robert Hagan (painter), Damien Aribert (french guitarist).
