= Michal Novotný (curator) =

Michal Novotný (born 1985) is a Czech art curator, critic, and writer. He is the Director of the Collection of Modern and Contemporary Art at National Gallery Prague.

== Biography ==
Michal Novotný is a leading Czech critic and curator of contemporary art who has successfully established himself in the international art scene.

He studied anthropology and philosophy at Charles University, completing his studies with a thesis titled “Where Do Objects Come From?” (Faculty of Humanities, 2017), which explores the concept of Object-Oriented Ontology developed by American philosopher Graham Harman.

From 2011 to 2018, he directed the Futura Centre for Contemporary Art in Prague. He has been serving as Director of the Collection of Modern and Contemporary Art at the National Gallery Prague since 2019. From 2016 to 2023, he co-led the Painting Studio at the Academy of Arts, Architecture and Design in Prague (UMPRUM) with Jiří Černický. In 2016, the website Artsy listed him as among the 20 most influential young curators in Europe. From 2016 to 2018, he was also an external curator at the Plato City Gallery in Ostrava.

Novotný's research focuses on the question of central-eastern Europe identity and how the notion of quality art is constructed in relation to material conditions. Novotný’s curatorial practice developed in line with Futura’s dramaturgical direction, which, under his leadership, focused on curatorial conceived group exhibitions (Bread and Salt, 2011; Five Minutes to Twelve; Touch, both 2012; A Glass of Water, 2013), solo exhibitions by international artists (Ciprian Mureșan, Chiara Fumai, Olof Olsson, among others), retrospectives of established Czech artists (Jiří Surůvka, Anna Daučíková, Lenka Klodová, and presentations of individual projects by mid-career and younger artists (Martin Kohout, Jan Pfeiffer, Ondřej Vicena, Marek Meduna, Romana Drdová, Lenka Vítková, Sláva Sobotovičová, and others). Notably, after the exhibition dialogue Harun Farocki / Zbyněk Baladrán (2015), Novotný was listed by the platform Artsy among the twenty most influential young European curators. His exhibitions emphasize the aesthetic dimension of installation and often feature site-specific scenography distinct from the conventional white-cube gallery model.

Novotný has curated numerous international exhibitions. Among them are the group shows Things (Design Cloud, Chicago, 2014), exploring the tension between the object and its representation, and Towards the Object (Museum of Modern and Contemporary Art, Rijeka, 2015), addressing the loss of subjectivity and the process of becoming an object. He has also collaborated individually with artists such as Jiří Kovanda (All the Birds of North America, Black Cube Museum, Denver, 2018) and Anna Daučíková (Solo Exhibition, State of Concept, Athens, 2018).

From 2016 to 2018, Novotný also worked with the PLATO Gallery in Ostrava, where he co-curated the exhibition Club Fiesta (2017, with Lumír Nykl), exploring the phenomenon of club music culture, and the group show Preparatory Portrait of a Young Girl (2017, co-curated with Linda and Daniela Dostálková). The latter referenced the influential book Preliminary Materials for a Theory of the Young-Girl (1999) by the French activist collective Tiqqun, which interprets the figure of the “Young Girl” as an embodiment of late capitalist consumer culture and its marketing mechanisms.

Michal Novotný’s most ambitious curatorial project to date is the traveling exhibition Orient, featuring artists from post-communist countries. It premiered at kim? Contemporary Art Centre in Riga (April–May 2018), and was later shown at BOZAR Centre for Fine Arts in Brussels (June–August 2018) and Bunkier Sztuki Gallery in Kraków (September–December 2018). The following year, Orient 2 took place at Kunsthalle Bratislava (July–October 2019), maintaining the same conceptual structure but featuring a largely new selection of works and artists.

The project culminated with Orient V at the Prague City Gallery, as part of the 9th Fotograf Festival (Archaeology of Euphoria: 1985–1995), presenting exclusively moving-image works (film, video, animation). The title serves as a self-ironic reference to the set of projections through which Eastern Europe, as a social construct, is co-created. According to Novotný, the region’s “wounded identity,” shaped by both shame and pride — a volatile mixture of inferiority and contempt — may have contributed to the current rise of nationalism and totalitarian tendencies. He describes the exhibition’s critical portrayal of the past thirty years as a “drama in five genre scenes,” where the displayed works, through subtle associations, illustrate proposed interpretative frameworks.

In addition to his curatorial work, Michal Novotný writes critical essays on contemporary art exhibitions, demonstrating a strong awareness of current international art trends and offering sharply formulated insights into curating, exhibition practice, and institutional art contexts. Notably, his essay The Emo-Romantic Turn published in Mousse Magazine.

He received the Věra Jirousová Award in the “Established Critic” category (2016). From 2014 to 2015, he headed the “Gallery” section of the biweekly A2. His writings appear in Art & Antiques, Flash Art International, Labyrint, Fotograf, Flash Art CZ/SK, and on online platforms such as Artalk, among others.
