= John Lowrie Morrison =

British artist

John Lowrie Morrison OBE
- Born: 1948; Glasgow
- Known for: painting
- Movement: expressionism
- Spouse: Maureen
- Patrons: Madonna, Sting
- Website: jolomo.com

John Lowrie Morrison OBE (born 1948, Maryhill, Glasgow), known as Jolomo, is a Scottish contemporary artist, producing expressionist oil paintings of Scottish landscapes.

== Career ==
He became interested in art at an early age, copying chocolate box pictures that his mother brought home from work, and painting on school art trips and family holidays. He attended Glasgow School of Art, from 1967 to 1971. He was forced to make a choice between making abstract designs for fashion and landscape painting and chose the latter. While his classmates favoured pop art and abstraction, he developed an expressionist style, influenced by artists such as Kokoschka, Chagall and Soutine.

He taught art for more than twenty years at Lochgilphead High School, appointed along the way as art adviser for Strathclyde, and only became a full-time artist in 1996. He was awarded an honorary degree by Abertay University in 2009 and was appointed Officer of the Order of the British Empire (OBE) in the 2011 New Year Honours for services to art and charity in Scotland.

Morrison produces about 100 paintings per month, completing three or four per day, six days a week. They sell very quickly, generating £2 million per year. As well as local buyers, he is patronised by celebrities such as Sting, Madonna, Simon Le Bon, Sophia Loren, Chris Patten and Rick Stein. His work is considered by some to be gaudy, while others describe it as unusual and vivid.

He completes the majority of his paintings in his studio, based on sketches and photographs. He also researches the history, folklore and geology of a place.

== Jolomo Award ==
He founded the Jolomo Award in 2007 - the prestigious annual award for Scottish Landscape Painting. It is the largest arts award in Scotland and the UK's largest privately funded arts award with a prize currently of £25,000 for the winner, and £35,000 for all the prizes.

== Personal life ==
Morrison lives in Tayvallich, Argyll, with his wife Maureen, whom he met while he was doing a student job in a design studio of a local carpet factory. They have three sons, Callum, Peter and Simon.

He is a devout Presbyterian.
