= Andre Dekker =

Dutch medical researcher

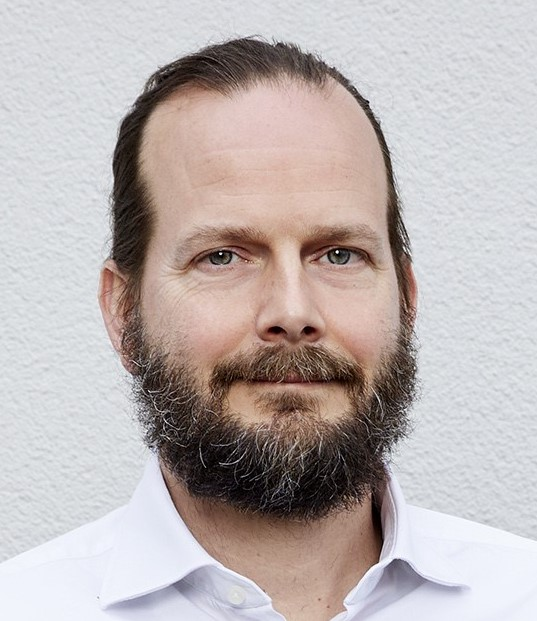
- Born: June 20, 1974 (age 52)
- Education: Ludger College; University of Twente; Eindhoven University of Technology; University Hospital Maastricht
- Occupations: Medical physicist, author and academic
- Scientific career
- Workplaces: Maastro Clinic; Maastricht University; Maastricht UMC+ Medical Data Works
- Thesis: Pressure-Volume Loops in Cardiac Surgery (2003)

Andre Dekker (born June 20, 1974) is a Dutch medical physicist, author, and academic who is a professor and head of clinical data science at Maastricht University (UM), Maastricht UMC+ and Maastro Clinic. He also holds the position of chief scientific officer at Medical Data Works.

Dekker's research centers on federated FAIR data infrastructures, AI for health outcome prediction models, and applying AI to enhance patient and citizen health. He has written of 250 articles and is the co-author of the book Fundamentals of Clinical Data Science.

== Education and early career ==
Dekker pursued a Master of Science in Applied Physics at the University of Twente and obtained another master's degree in Technology Design from the Eindhoven University of Technology in 2000. He completed his PhD in medicine in 2003, and undertook a residency in Radiotherapy Medical Physics at Maastro Clinic from 2003 to 2005.

== Career ==
Dekker served as a radiotherapy medical physics resident at Maastro Clinic from 2003 to 2005, later assuming the role of medical physics head and member of the management team until 2010. He was the head of Information & Services, member of the management team at Maastro Clinic from 2010 to 2015, and scientific director at Maastro Innovations from 2010 to 2018. He has served on advisory boards of organizations, including the European Society for Radiotherapy & Oncology, Hanarth Fund, MD Anderson, Novo Nordisk Foundation, Luxemburg National Research Fund and Peter Munk Cardiac Centre. He serves as the head of clinical data science at UM's Medical Center, while concurrently holding the positions of full professor of clinical data science, chief scientific officer at Medical Data Works, and medical physicist at Maastro Clinic.

== Media ==
Dekker co-led the ProTRAIT project, focused on creating a unified database for evaluating clinical data from patients undergoing proton treatment, which was featured in Dutch media outlets. He emphasized AI's potential to enhance decision-making in radiation oncology by facilitating shared decision-making between physicians and patients in an Imaging Technology News piece, and discussed ethical AI solutions benefiting patients through academic, healthcare, and technology partnerships in an interview with Innovation Origins. He was invited to the American Society for Radiation Oncology to share his vision on the future of AI in the radiation oncology field. In addition, he addressed researchers from NITC and doctors from MVRCCRI, highlighting the significant potential of applying machine learning methods for early cancer detection and treatment.

== Research ==
Dekker has focused his research on constructing global FAIR data-sharing infrastructures, employing AI to develop outcome prediction models from that data, and utilizing those models to enhance patient outcomes.

Dekker, alongside Pieter Kubben and Michel Dumontier, co-authored Fundamentals of Clinical Data Science which delved into topics such as personalized medicine offering insights in a healthcare-optimized style without requiring mathematical or coding expertise. His research on the increasing significance of clinical decision-support systems in radiation oncology discussed the multistage process involved in developing robust prediction models, emphasizing the critical role of predictive models in optimizing treatment outcomes. In a collaborative study, he proposed a system for characterizing and classifying oligometastatic disease.

Dekker explored radiomics, particularly in non-small-cell lung cancer imaging, addressing the challenges of extracting quantitative features from medical images to develop diagnostic, prognostic, or predictive models integrating biological and medical data. Collaborating with a team of researchers, he conducted a radiomic analysis of 1,019 patients with lung or head-and-neck cancer using computed tomography (CT) imaging data, identifying prognostic radiomic features that showed significant power in independent datasets of the cancer patients. Additionally, in describing the concept and potential of radiomics in cancer research, he and his collaborators proposed guidelines to enhance the scientific integrity and clinical relevance of radiomics investigations. Furthermore, his systematic review assessed the reproducibility of radiomic features used in cancer imaging for clinical decision making, noting that feature stability is influenced by factors such as image acquisition settings, reconstruction algorithms, and preprocessing methods.

Dekker introduced a method for analyzing plethysmographic signals to identify heart rate variability parameters linked to respiration rate, leading to an improved pulse oximeter functionality for noninvasive respiration rate monitoring. His development of an apparatus resulted in an approved patent for monitoring secondary physiological processes by analyzing optical signal variations. He then presented a method utilizing photoplethysmography to gather physiological parameters, involving filtering and analyzing pleth signals to identify components of interest for determining respiratory parameters.

== Awards and honors ==
- 2019 – Sir Godfrey Hounsfield Award, British Institute of Radiology
- 2020 – Health Care Award, Computable

== Bibliography ==
=== Books ===
- Fundamentals of Clinical Data Science (2019) ISBN 978-3319997124

=== Selected articles ===
- Lambin, P., Rios-Velazquez, E., Leijenaar, R., Carvalho, S., Van Stiphout, R. G., Granton, P., ... & Aerts, H. J. (2012). Radiomics: extracting more information from medical images using advanced feature analysis. European journal of cancer, 48(4), 441–446.
- Kumar, V., Gu, Y., Basu, S., Berglund, A., Eschrich, S. A., Schabath, M. B., ... & Gillies, R. J. (2012). Radiomics: the process and the challenges. Magnetic resonance imaging, 30(9), 1234–1248.
- Leijenaar, R. T., Carvalho, S., Velazquez, E. R., Van Elmpt, W. J., Parmar, C., Hoekstra, O. S., ... & Lambin, P. (2013). Stability of FDG-PET radiomics features: an integrated analysis of test-retest and inter-observer variability. Acta oncologica, 52(7), 1391–1397.
- Aerts, H. J., Velazquez, E. R., Leijenaar, R. T., Parmar, C., Grossmann, P., Carvalho, S., ... & Lambin, P. (2014). Decoding tumour phenotype by noninvasive imaging using a quantitative radiomics approach. Nature communications, 5(1), 4006.
- Lambin, P., Leijenaar, R. T., Deist, T. M., Peerlings, J., De Jong, E. E., Van Timmeren, J., ... & Walsh, S. (2017). Radiomics: the bridge between medical imaging and personalized medicine. Nature reviews Clinical oncology, 14(12), 749–762.
- Lustberg, T., van Soest, J., Gooding, M., Peressutti, D., Aljabar, P., van der Stoep, J., ... & Dekker, A. (2018). Clinical evaluation of atlas and deep learning based automatic contouring for lung cancer. Radiotherapy and Oncology, 126(2), 312–317.
- Guckenberger, M., Lievens, Y., Bouma, A. B., Collette, L., Dekker, A., Desouza, N. M., ... & Ost, P. (2020). Characterisation and classification of oligometastatic disease: a European Society for Radiotherapy and Oncology and European Organisation for Research and Treatment of Cancer consensus recommendation. THE LANCET ONCOLOGY, 21(1), 18–28.
