= Daphne Haas-Kogan =

American radiation oncologist

- Born: March 26, 1964 (age 62); Israel

Academic background
- Education: BSc, Biochemistry and Molecular Biology, 1986, Harvard University; MD, UCSF School of Medicine

Daphne Adele Haas-Kogan (born March 26, 1964) is an American radiation oncologist. She is the Willem and Corrie Hees Family Professor of Radiation Oncology at Harvard Medical School.

== Early life and education ==
Haas-Kogan was born on March 26, 1964. She was born to father Martin Haas, a Holocaust survivor from the south of the Netherlands. Following the Holocaust, he relocated to Israel then brought his family to San Diego in 1980.

Following high school, Haas-Kogan completed her undergraduate degree in biochemistry and molecular biology from Harvard University and her medical degree from the University of California, San Francisco (UCSF). She remained at UCSF for her radiation oncology residency, where she was also the chief resident and a postdoctoral fellow.

== Career ==
In July 2015, Haas-Kogan succeeded Jay Harris as Chair of the Department of Radiation Oncology at the Dana–Farber Cancer Institute, Brigham and Women’s Hospital (BWHC), and Boston Children’s Hospital. She was also appointed professor at Harvard Medical School and become an endowed professor of Radiation Oncology at BWHC. Two years later, Haas-Kogan was installed as the Radiation Oncology Professor at Harvard Medical School and elected a fellow of the Association of American Physicians.

In 2019, Haas-Kogan was elected a member of the National Academy of Medicine "for research on the study of genetic abnormalities of brain tumors and successfully translating laboratory discoveries to the treatment of cancer, which led to a multitude of successful clinical trials that have helped shape targeted therapies for adult and pediatric malignancies." She was also honored with an election to the American Society for Radiation Oncology Fellow designation. In January 2020, Haas-Kogan was named to Boston magazine's 2020 Top Doctors. During the same month, she received a research grant for her project "Dependence of DIPGs on DNA polymerase q for DNA repair defines a new therapeutic target."

== Personal life ==
Haas-Kogan and her partner Suzanne Ezrre have three children together.
