= Q. S. Serafijn =

Dutch conceptual artist and author (1960–2024)

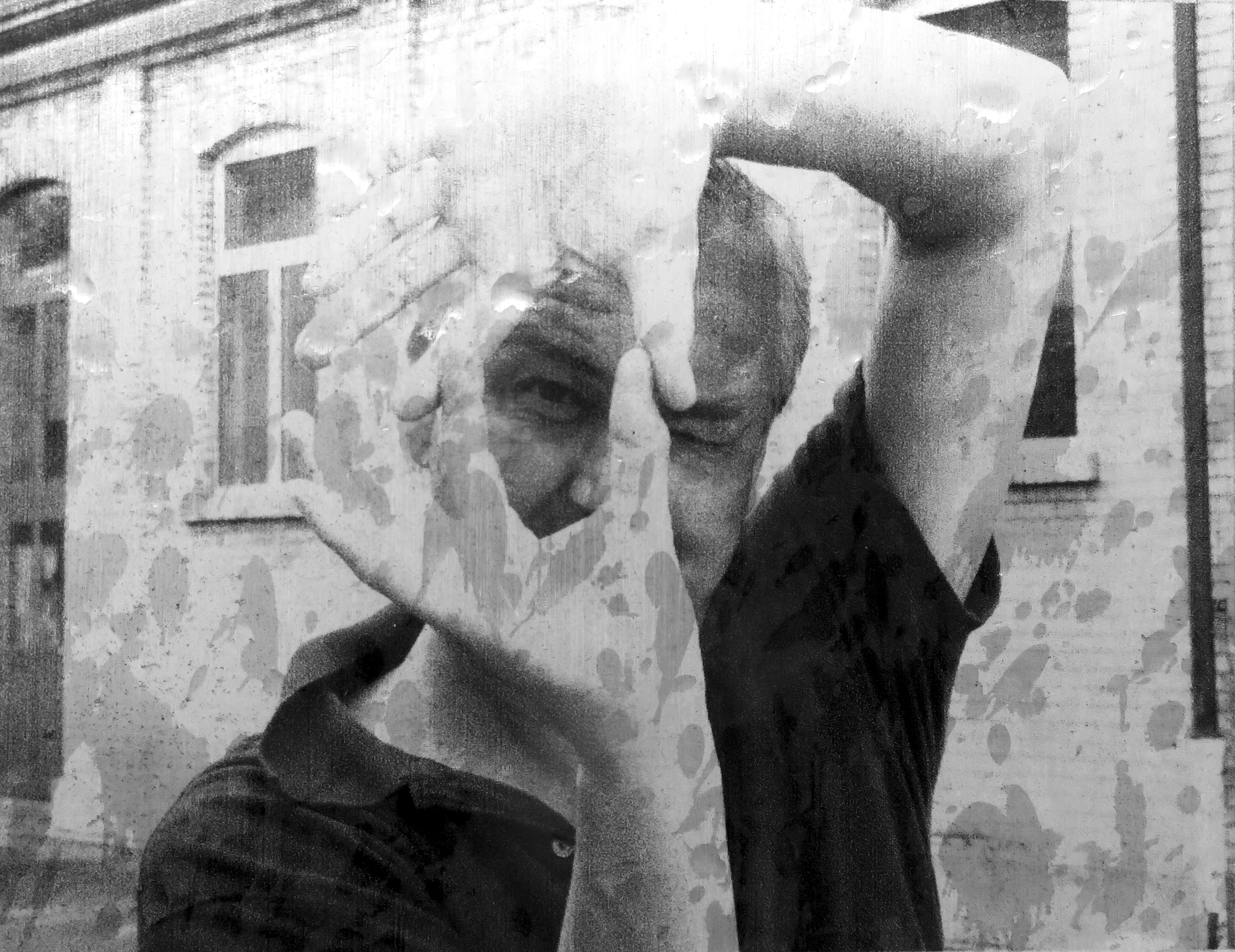
Portret van Q.S. Serafijn, c. 2010

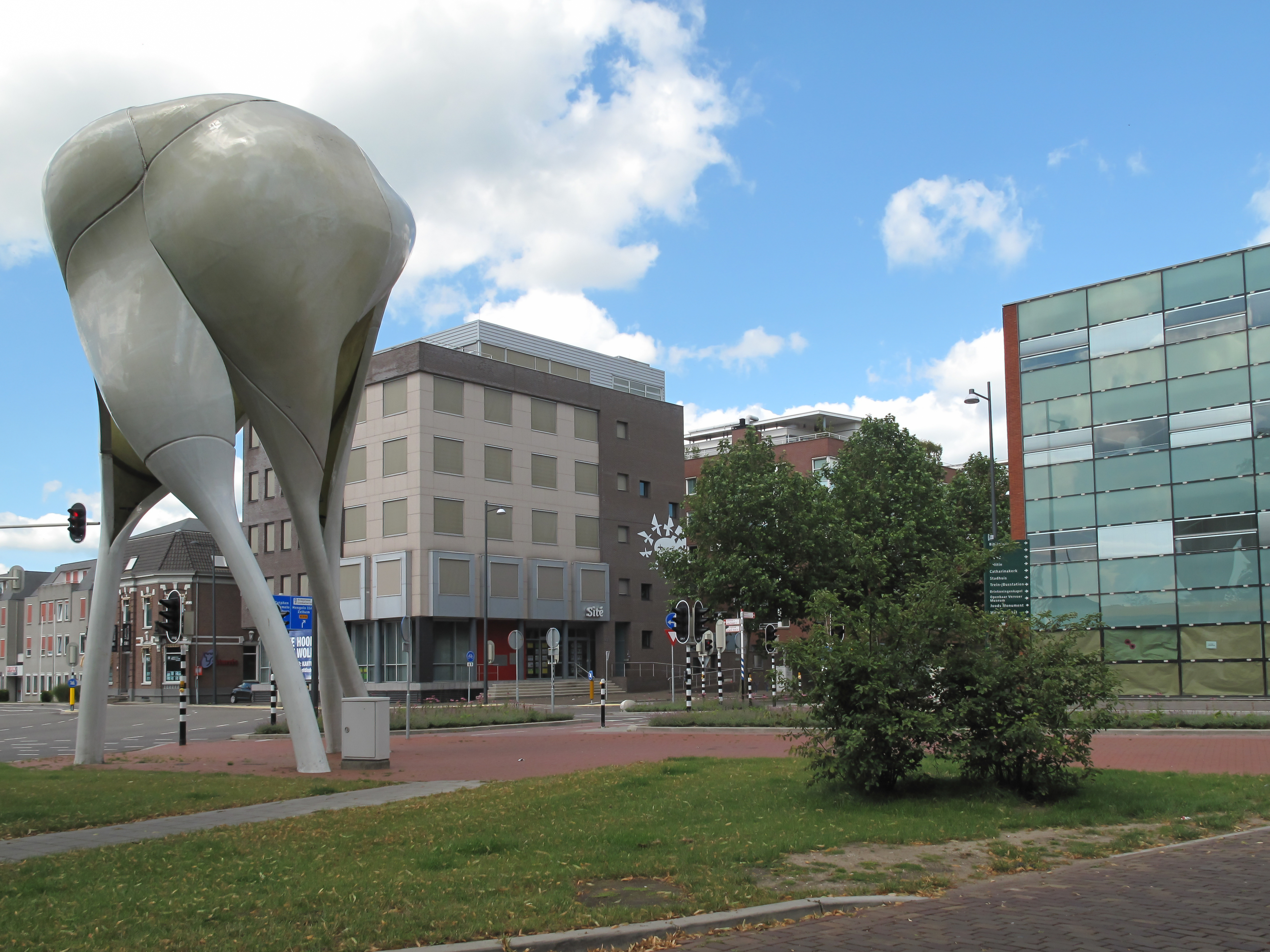
The D-Tower in Doetinchem, 2012

Robert Hack (19 February 1960 – 1 June 2024), known professionally as Q. S. Serafijn, was a Dutch conceptual artist and author, who worked as sculptor, photographer, and installation artist.

== Life and work ==
Born in Roosendaal en Nispen, Serafijn attended the Academie voor Beeldende Vorming (now Fontys Hogeschool voor de Kunsten) in Tilburg from 1978 to 1983 and the Ateliers '63 in Haarlem from 1983 to 1986.

After graduation he settled as an independent artist in Rotterdam in 1991. He was also lecturer of visual arts and art theory at the Jan Van Eyck Academie from 1991 to 1993, visual arts at the Willem de Kooning Academie from 1993 to 1999 and visual arts and art theory at the Gerrit Rietveld Academie since 2007. In 1992 Q.S. Serafijn received the Charlotte Köhler Award, an incentive prize of the Prins Bernhard Cultuurfonds.

For the city center of Doetinchem Q.S. Serafijn and the Dutch architect Lars Spuybroek designed the so-called D-tower, a large, interactive sculpture connected to a website that surveys the emotional lives of the inhabitants. In 2010 Q.S. Serafijn and sculptor Gijs Assmann (born 1966) released the equestrian statue, entitled John Wayne, in the Wateringse Veld, a new district of Den Haag.

Serafijn died in Rotterdam on 1 June 2024, at the age of 64.

== Selected publications ==
- Lily Van Ginneken, Jaap Guldemond, Q.S. Serafijn (1990), Panorama.
- Q.S. Serafijn (2003). Museum als pretpark!: aantekening 0437.
- Q.S. Serafijn (2007), Het Czaar Peter Dossier.
- Q.S. Serafijn, Jasper Henderson (2010), Het wonder van Wateringse Veld.
- Q.S. Serafijn, Rudolf Gerard Abel Kaulingfreks, Jasper Henderson (2012), Q. S. Serafijn, notes 3.
