= Ove Lucas =

Dutch art curator (born 1960)

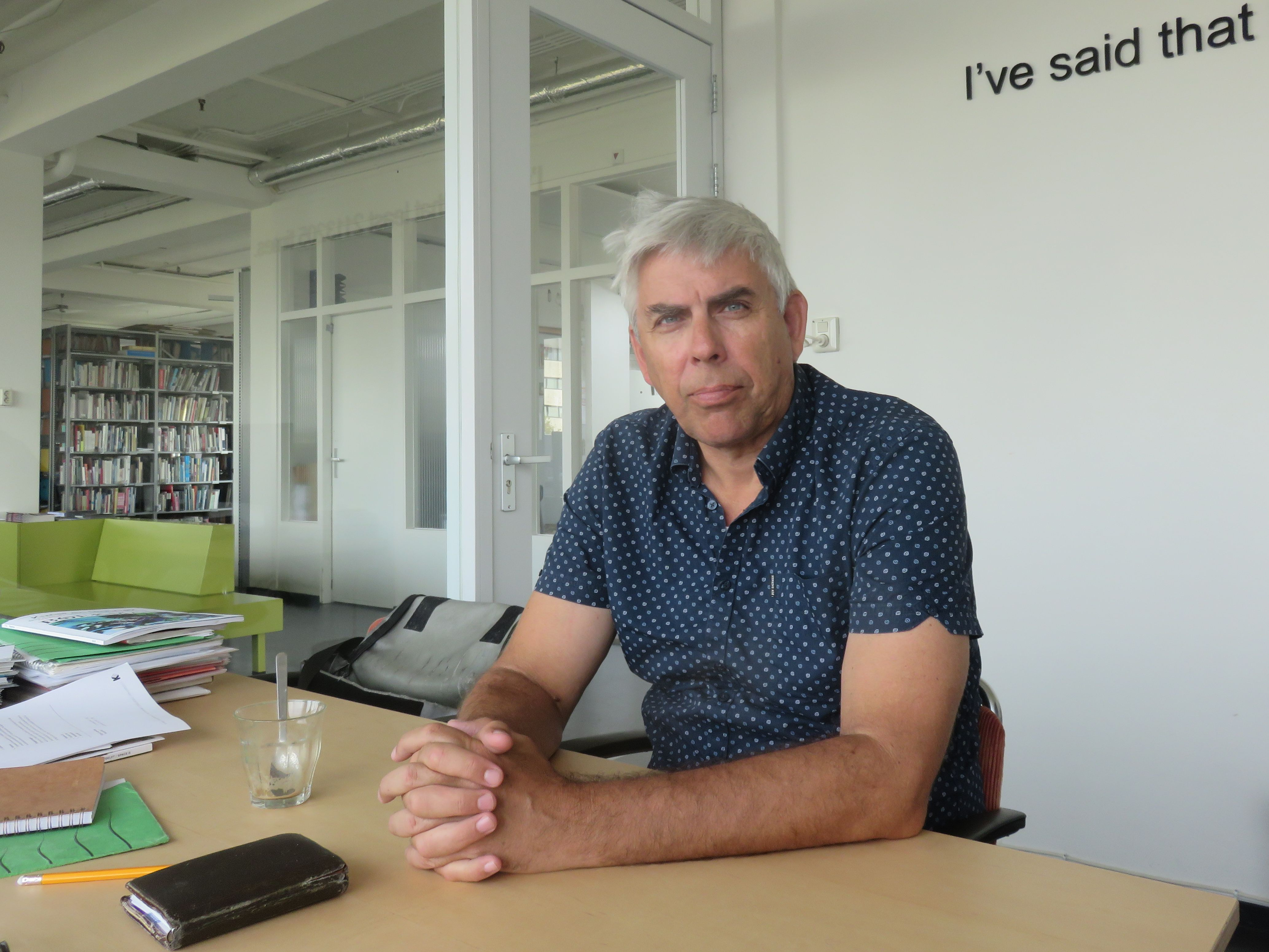
- Ove Lucas in Centrum Beeldende Kunst Rotterdam, 2018
- Born: ca. 1960
- Occupation: Director Center for Visual Arts Rotterdam
- Years active: Since 1985

Ove Lucas (born ca. 1960) is a Dutch curator and director of the Center for Visual Arts Rotterdam.

== Biography ==
=== Early career ===
Lucas started his career in the Rotterdam art sector in the early eighties during his replacement service at the Lijnbaancentrum Rotterdam under Felix Valk. He subsequently attended the School of Journalism, which he completed in 1985.

Later in the eighties, Lucas became exhibition maker at the Center for Visual Arts Rotterdam. In this role, he organized the Rotterdam Assorti exhibition in the Hal Building, the current Hotel New York, in 1990 with city curator Jan van Adrichem of Museum Boijmans Van Beuningen and Thomas Meyer zu Schlochtern of the Rotterdam Art Foundation.

In the nineties, under Hans Walgenbach, Lucas worked as artistic director of the Villa Alckmaer exhibition space. In 1999 the exhibition facility moved to TENT Rotterdam in the Witte de Withstraat, which was led by the same trio as before: Lucas as general coordinator in collaboration with Arno van Roosmalen and Thomas Meijer zu Schlochtern.

=== Director of Center for Visual Arts Rotterdam ===
In 2006, Lucas was appointed director of Stichting Centrum Beeldende Kunst CBK (Center for Visual Arts) Rotterdam. Since the departure of Ton de Vos, the successor of Hans Walchenbach, in 2005, he had been acting director. In the following year, in 2007, he coordinated the privatization of the Center for Visual Arts.

The CBK Rotterdam was reorganized by Lucas with parts of moved into and independent Rotterdam Artotheek. An important task that has remained with the CBK Rotterdam is the management of the sculpture collection in the outdoor space in the city. He actively participates in the public debate on this subject, and on more general art issues in the city.

== Work ==
=== Rotterdam Assorti, 1990 ===
In the year 1990 about 1200 visual artists were living in Rotterdam and its direct surroundings, of which half was under the age of 35. In order to present the quality of these artists a selection was made of the work of 38 young artists, presented in the former office building of the Holland America Lines (Nederlandsch Amerikaansche Stoomvaart Maatschappij).

A selection was made of 24 young new artists under the age of 35, among them Ben Zegers and Marian Breedveld. Further more there were 12 more familiar artists present such as Geert van de Camp, Otto Egberts, Daan van Golden, Johan van Oord, John van 't Slot, Henk Tas, Hans Verwey, Co Westerik and Erik Wijntjes.

== Publications, a selection ==
- Ove Lucas, Grafiek : vier interviews van Ove Lucas met Rotterdamse grafici : Michiel Brink, Dirk Huizer, Gerard Immerzeel, Hans Koopman, Joost Minnigh. Centrum Beeldende Kunst-Artoteek Rijnmond : Stichting Kunstzinnige Vorming Rotterdam, 1988.
- André Dekker & Ove Lucas. Zeitweiliges Treffen : actuele kunst uit Frankfurt = aktuelle Kunst aus Frankfurt. Centrum Beeldende Kunst, 1988.
- Ove Lucas & Bob Goedewaagen (photography), 5 jaar 51 kunstenaars. Rotterdam : Centrum Beeldende Kunst, 1992.
- Paul van der Eerden & Ove Lucas. Sorti du labyrinthe, Rotterdam : Centrum Beeldende Kunst Rotterdam, 1996.
