= Ben Zegers =

Dutch visual artist (born 1962)

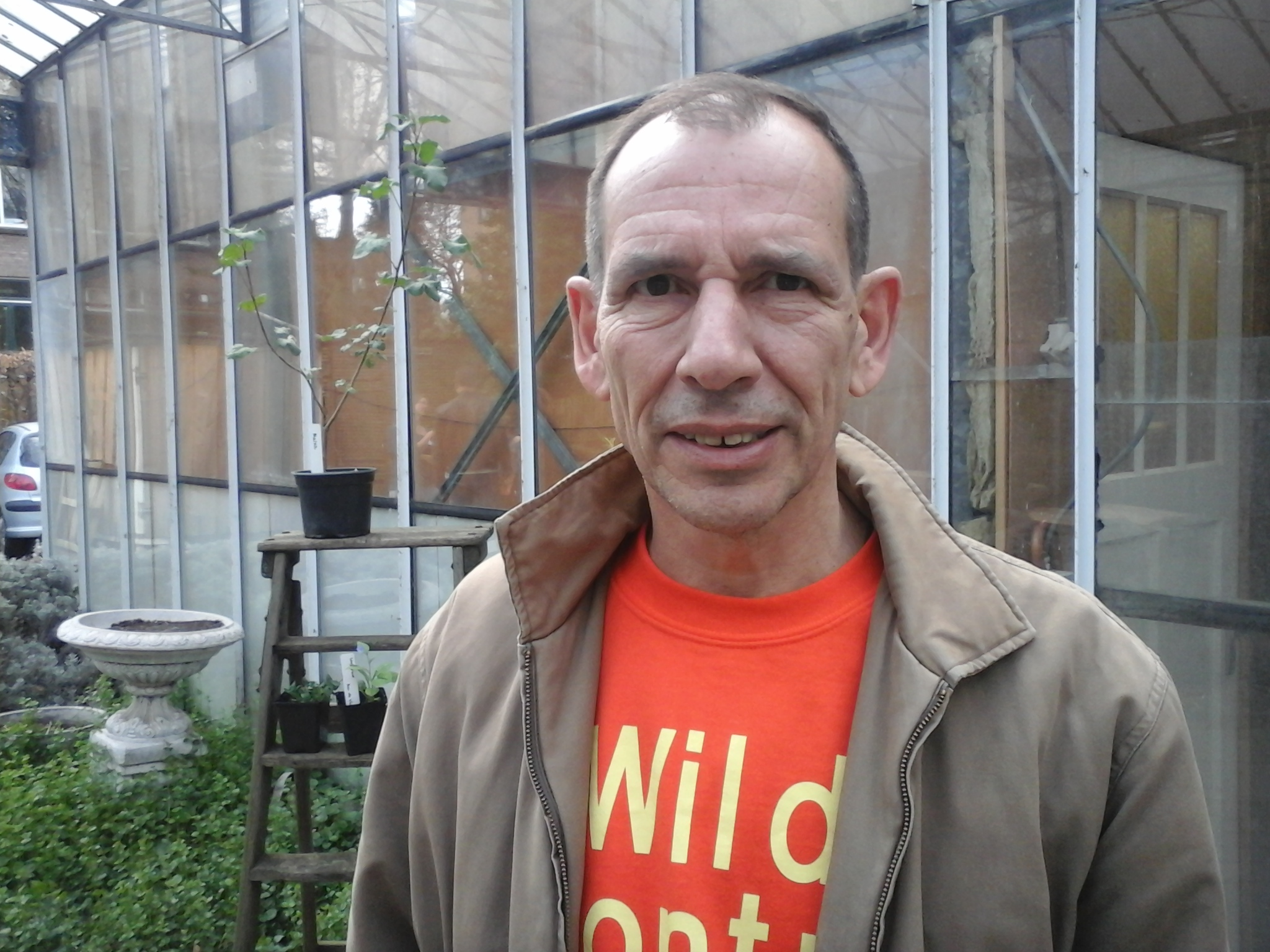
- Ben Zegers, 2018
- Born: Bernardus Stefanus Henricus Zegers; 3 March 1962; Utrecht, Netherlands
- Education: St. Joost Academy of Art and Design; Ateliers '63, Haarlem
- Known for: Sculpture
- Awards: Charlotte Köhler Prize
- Website: benzegers.nl

Bernardus Stefanus Henricus (Ben) Zegers (Utrecht, 3 March 1962) is a Dutch visual artist, active as a sculptor and installation artist, and teacher and coordinator at the Gerrit Rietveld Academy.

Zegers came into prominence with sculptures, that balances between sculpture and functional design. His early work was told to "alienate household items, especially mattresses, but also chairs and tables, and places them in the useless and meaningful sculptural context."

== Biography ==
=== Education and early career ===
Zegers was born and raised in Utrecht, and from 1980 to 1986 studied art at the St. Joost Academy of Art and Design in Den Bosch. He then continued his studies for two years at the Ateliers '63 in Haarlem from 1986 to 1988.

In 1988 Zegers settled as a visual artist in Rotterdam, where he has lived and worked ever since. In that year the Prins Bernhard Cultuurfonds Zegers and five other young artists Giny Vos, Nicolaas de Haan, Agnes Roelofse, Hans van Bentem, and Trudi van den Berg were granted an assignment to get their professional practice started.

In 1988 he had his first solo exhibition in the Teylers Museum, Haarlem. In 1989 he was one of the 25 Dutch contemporary artists at the Edinburgh Festival. His work was engaged that year into the city collection of Rotterdam at Museum Boymans Van Beuningen together with the work of other young artist, that had settled in Rotterdam; Geert van de Camp, Allard Budding, and Lidwien van de Ven.

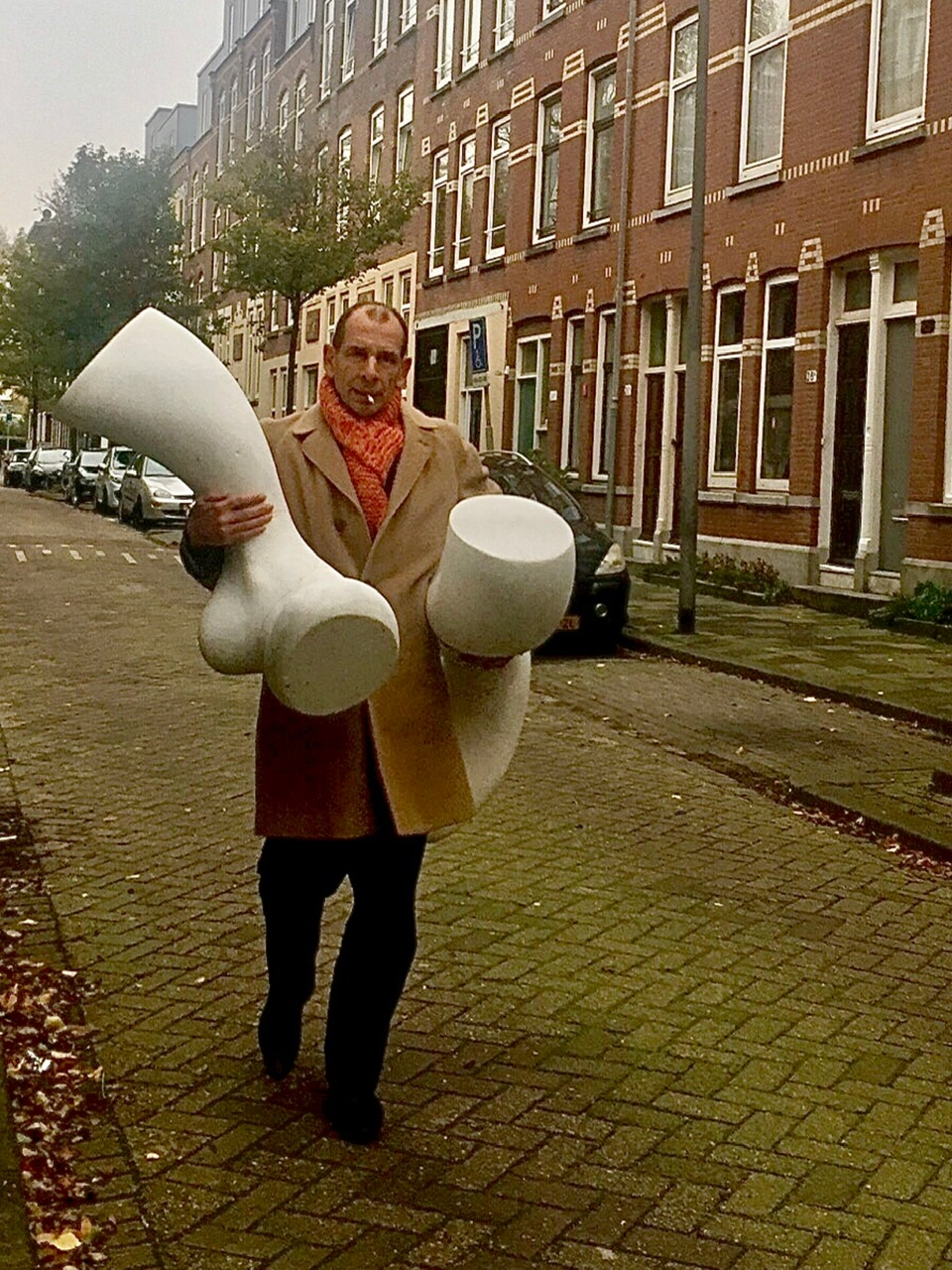
Ben Zegers with some molds under his arms.

In 1990 he participated in group exhibitions at Galerie Van Krimpen and Galerie Fons Welters in Amsterdam and at Museum Boymans Van Beuningen in Rotterdam, where he regularly returned. He was awarded the Charlotte Köhler Prize in 1994.

=== Later career ===
In 1991 Zeger was selected with Ab van Hanegem, Aernout Mik, Kaap, and Lidwien van de Ven for the São Paulo Art Biennial, Eventually the Dutch contribution was redrawn, and ended up at an art fair in Los Angeles.

In the new millennium Zegers also started as sculpture teacher and coordinator at the Gerrit Rietveld Academy in Amsterdam. The works of Zegers are among others in the city collection of the Museum Boymans Van Beuningen in Rotterdam, and in public spaces in Rotterdam, Oostzaan, and Dokkum.

In 1990 Zegers was granted an encouragement award by the Amsterdams Fonds voor de Kunst, and in 1993 he received a Charlotte Köhler Price.

== Exhibitions, a selection ==
- 1989. International Festival, Edinburgh.
- 1990. Rotterdam Assorti, Hal Building, Rotterdam
- 1990. First Blossom, Galerie Van Krimpen, Amsterdam.
- 1990. Collected Works '2, Museum Boymans van Beuningen, Rotterdam.
- 1990. MultipleChoice, Galerie Fons Welters, Amsterdam.
- 1990. Mixed Company solo exhibition, Kunstmuseum Den Haag, The Hague.
- 1991. São Paulo Art Biennial
- 1993. Verwandtschaften exhibition, Kunsthal Rotterdam.
- 1993. Look Alike: Ben Zegers. Museum Boymans-van Beuningen Rotterdam November 21, 1993/31 January 1994. Museum Boymans-van Beuningen, 1993.
- 2000. Ettre(s) a mon père. Kunsthal Rotterdam.

=== Photo gallery ===
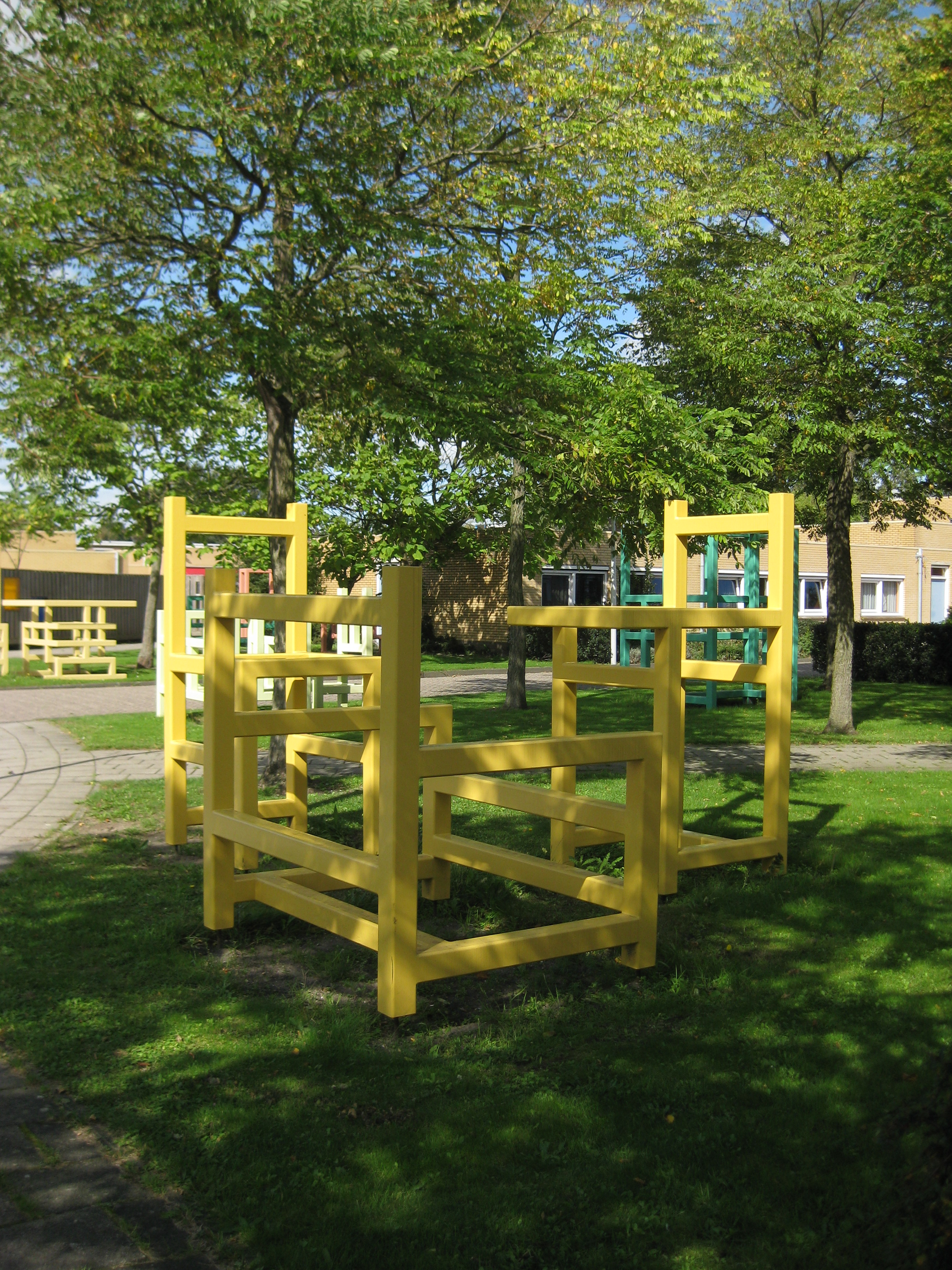
Gerrit, Tuindorp Oostzaan, 1992

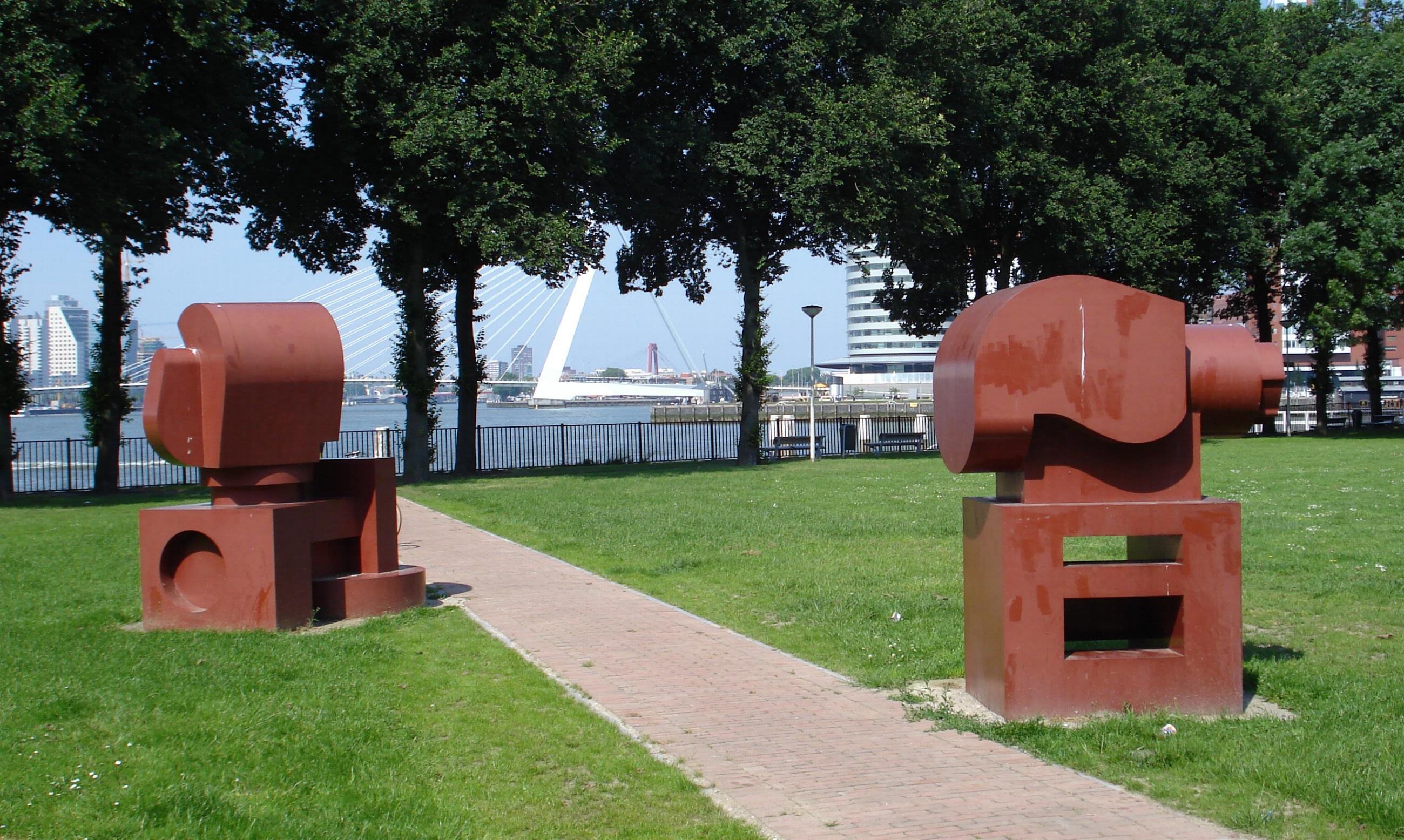
Vaart vrij!, Katendrecht, 1997

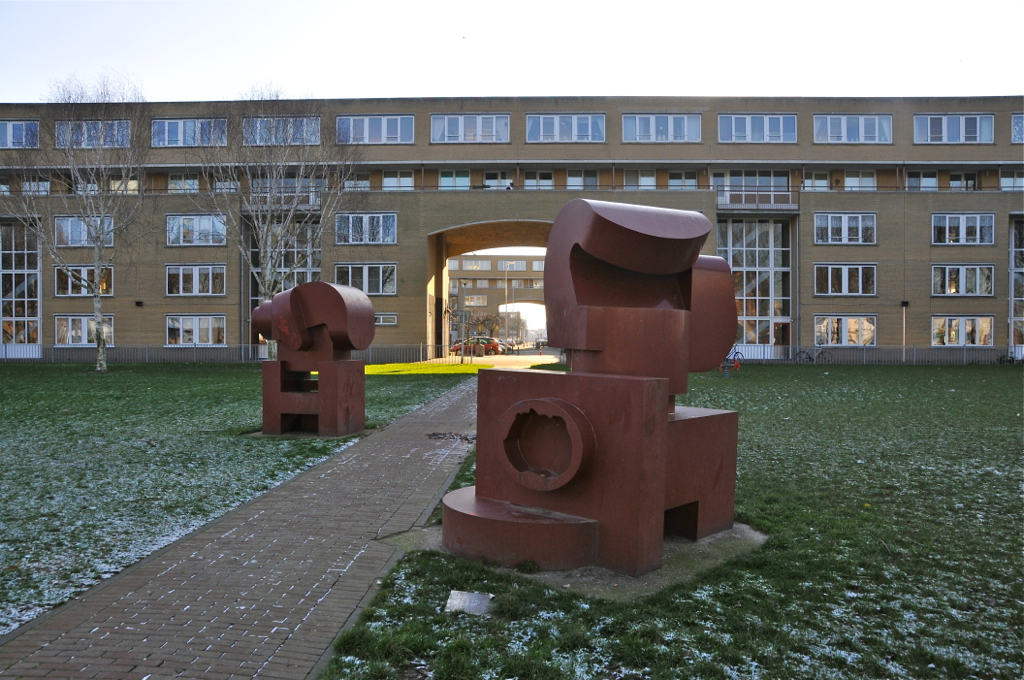
Vaart vrij!, Katendrecht, 1997

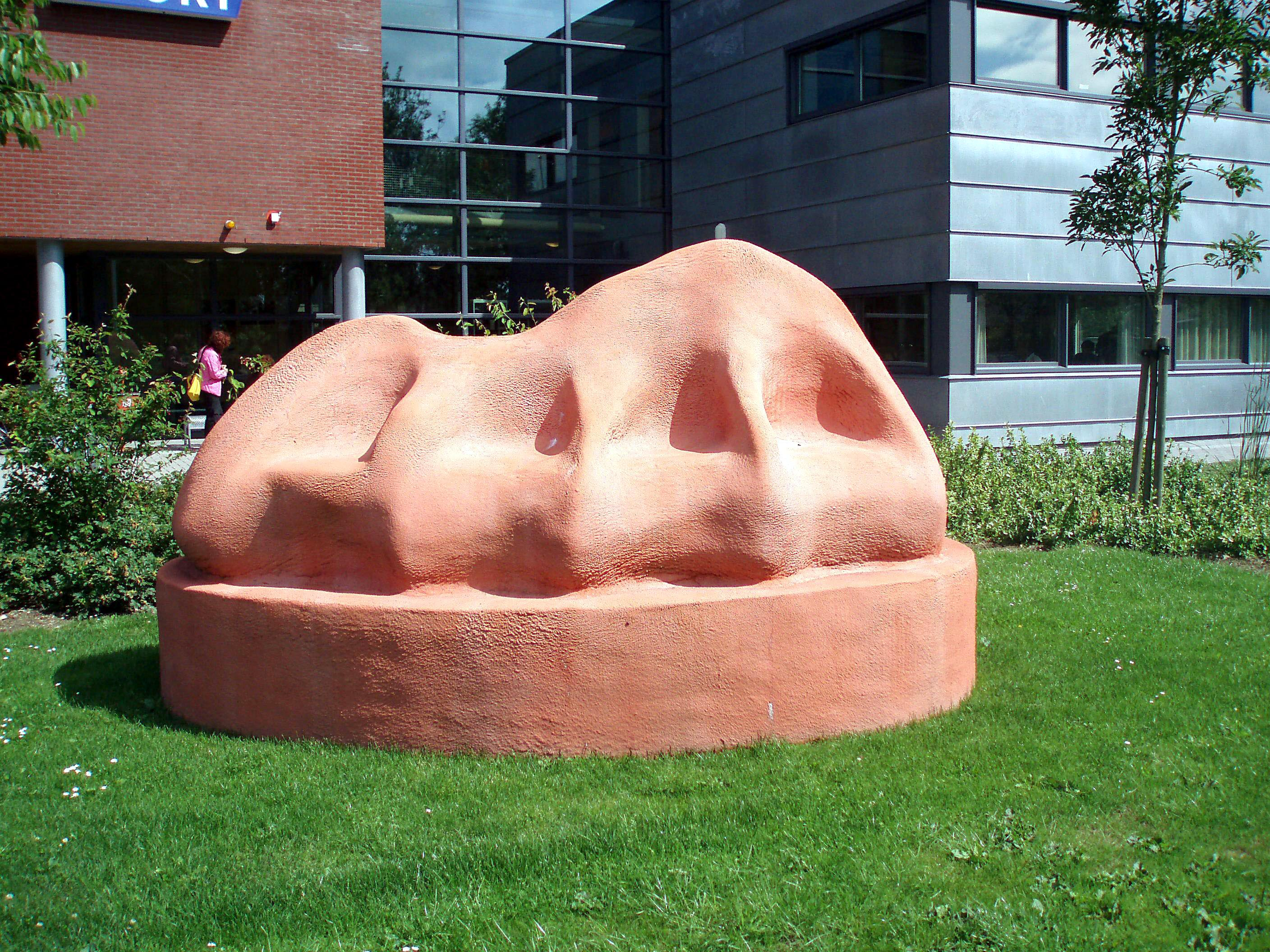
Untitled, Dokkum, 2004

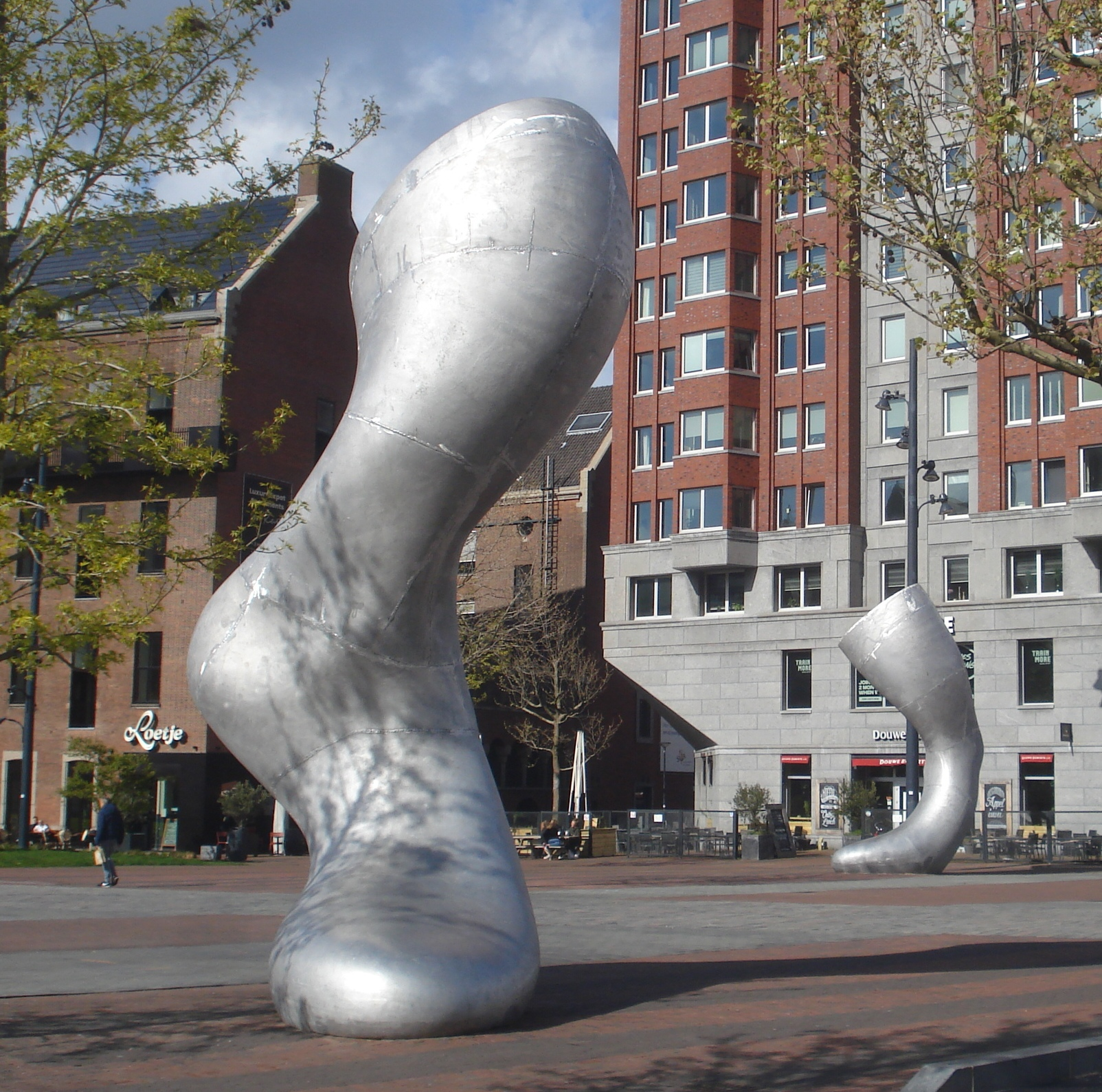
Iedereen is dood behalve wij, Rotterdam, 2011.

== Publications ==
- Zegers, Ben. Ben Zegers: Museum Boymans-van Beuningen Rotterdam November 21, 1993/31 January 1994. Museum Boymans-van Beuningen, 1993.
