= Henk Tas =

Dutch artist

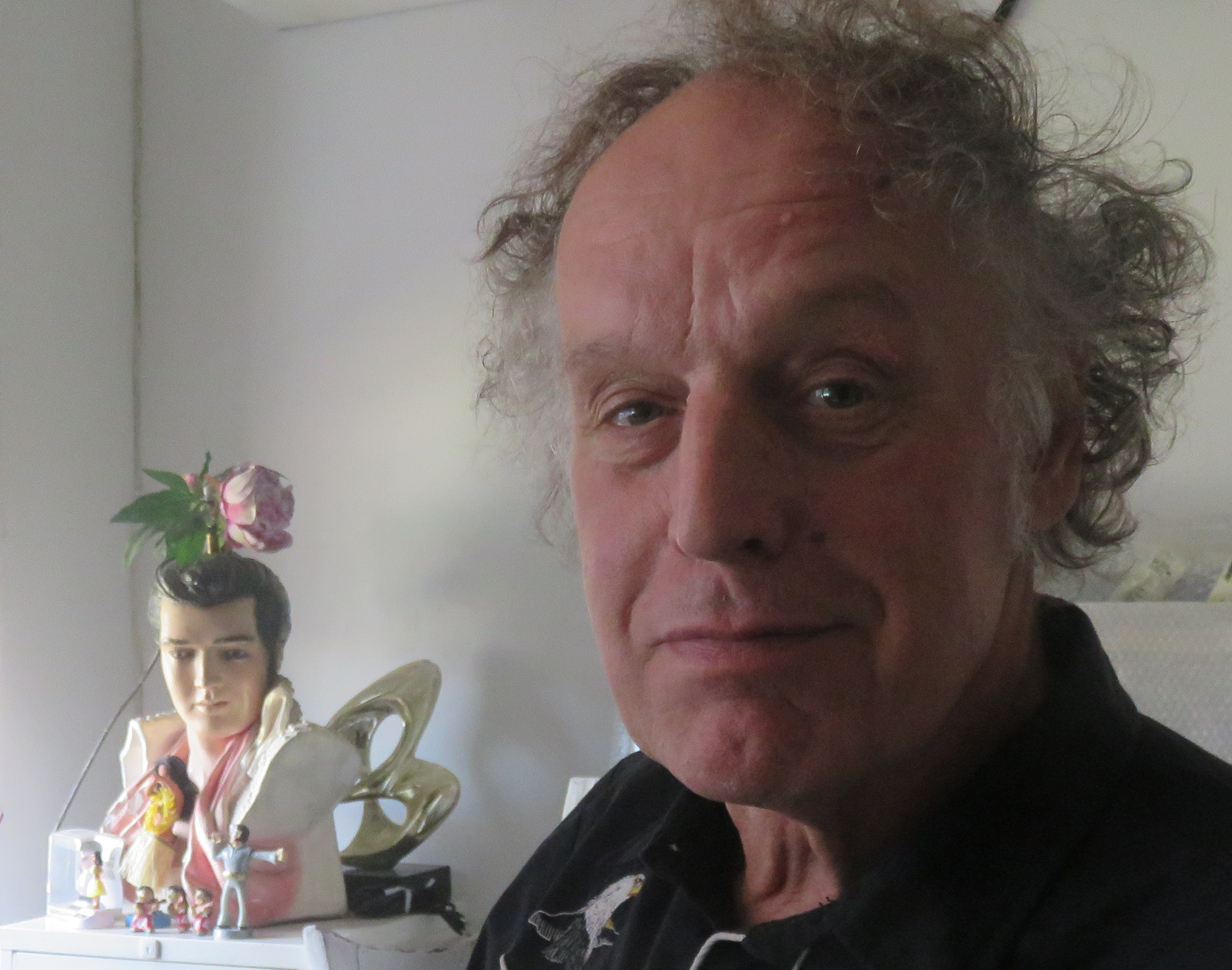
- Henk Tas, 2018
- Born: Hendrik Everhart Tas; 23 July 1948; Rotterdam
- Education: Willem de Kooning Academy
- Known for: Photography, visual art
- Awards: Hugo Erfurth prize (1991)
- Website: www.henktas.nl

Hendrik Everhart (Henk) Tas (born 23 July 1948) is a Dutch visual artist, working as a sculptor, photographer, graphic artist, and wall painter.

== Biography ==
Tas was born in 1948 in Rotterdam, and grew up part of his youth in Canada. In Rotterdam he studied from 1966 to 1972 at the Academy of Visual Arts in Rotterdam in the direction free drawing and painting.

After graduating, Tas settled in Rotterdam as a visual artist. He starting with graphics and then focused on staged photography. His work is inspired by rock music and pop music. He used to stage his images with hats, toys, instruments, lights and plastic figures, which result in what he called "toverfotografie" (magic photography). He also made screen prints and large format mosaics inspired by lyrics.

At the end of the 1980s Tas made a quarterly magazine about the Everly Brothers with Rick Vermeulen. Together wit similar work as the magazines of Hard Werken, the work of poet Jules Deelder, the published 010, Tas made a significant contribution to the cultural renewal in the city in those days.

In 1991, Tas was awarded the Hugo Erfurth Prize by Agfa. Tas's works are included in the collections of the Hugo Erfurth prize in Rotterdam, the Rijksmuseum and the Stedelijk Museum Amsterdam, the Groninger Museum, and the Centre Pompidou in Paris.

== Work ==
=== Graphic work ===
Henk Tas started his own graphic work at the art academy, with which he had a first exhibition in 1971 in Galerie Noordeinde 31 in Spijkenisse. In 1972 he was nominated for the Drempelprijs. In the following years he exhibited screen prints at 't Venster in Rotterdam in 1973, and at the Stedelijk Museum Amsterdam in 1975.

In 1976 he collaborated with the third Science Fiction festival in Rotterdam. He decorated spaces in the Lantaren and Erasmus University together with Bob van Persie, Hans Citroen and Willem van Drunen. The following year in 1977 he exhibits textile photography at Galerie Gee in Geervliet.

=== Exhibitions, a selection ===
- 1971. Grafiek van Emile Puettmann, Hanny Huser en Henk Tas. Galerie Noordeinde 31, Spijkenisse.
- 1975. Henk Tas and Hans van Dijk, Stedelijk Museum Amsterdam
- 1988. Rotterdamse School?, Museum Boijmans Van Beuningen. Group exhibition with works of Daan van Golden, Charlie van Rest, Peter Redert, Lydia Schouten, and Hard Werken.
- 1990. Rotterdam Assorti, Hal Building, Rotterdam
- Galerie Baudelaire, Antwerpen
- Exponera Fotogalleri, Malmö
- Govinda Gallery, Washington D.C.

== Publications, a selection ==
- Henk Tas, Rick Vermeulen, Els Barents. Why Me Lord. 2001.
- Diana Wind. Museumkrant: Henk Tas, 2001.
