= Galerie Wim van Krimpen =

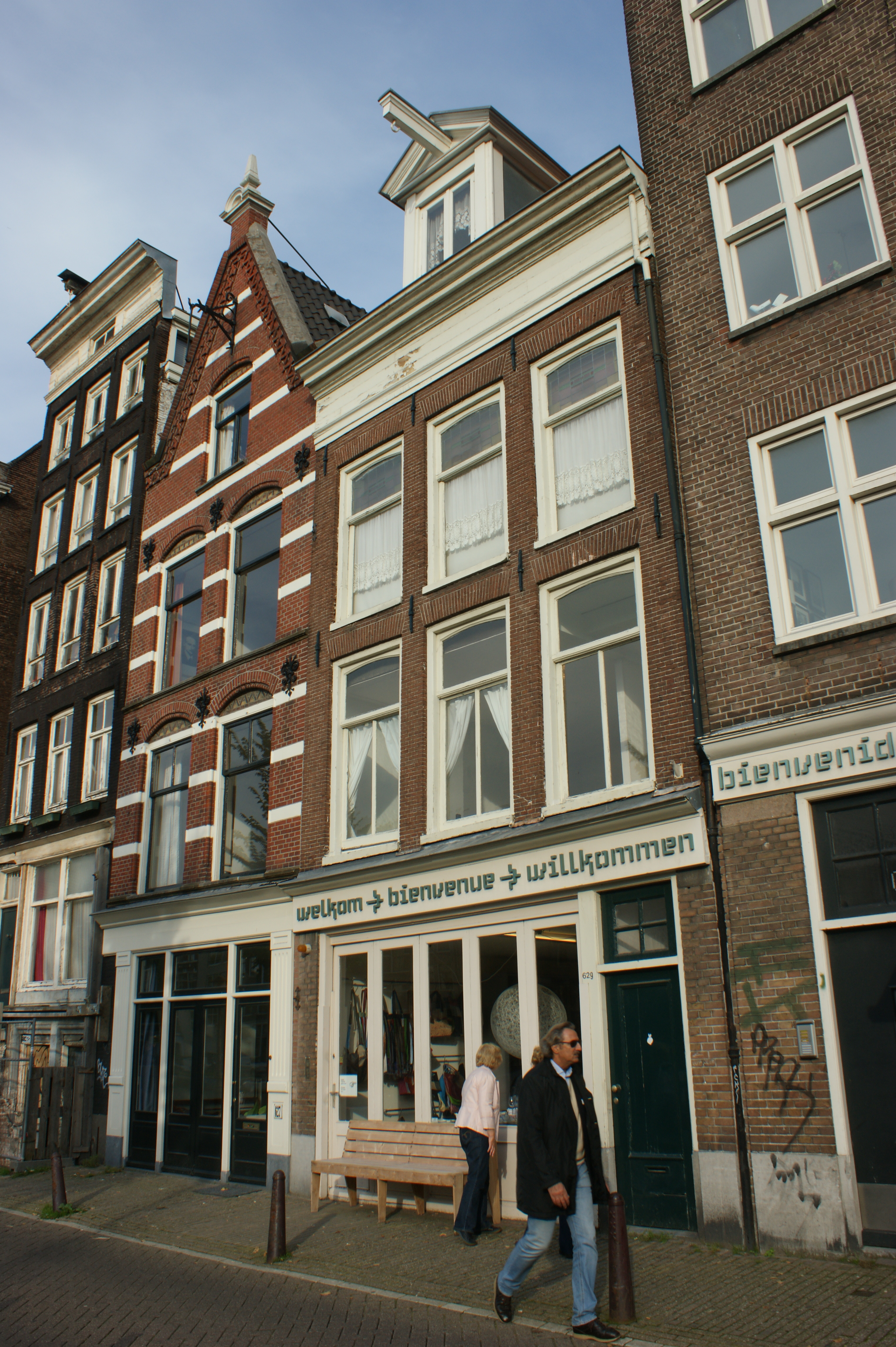
- Location(s): Prinsengracht 629, Amsterdam Westersingel 83, Rotterdam Oude Binnenweg, Rotterdam Hazenstraat 20, Amsterdam
- Origins: Founded in 1978
- Key people: Wim van Krimpen (founders)

Galerie Wim van Krimpen, also Galerie Van Krimpen is a Dutch former art gallery in Amsterdam and Rotterdam by Wim van Krimpen.

== History ==
=== Amsterdam from 1978 to 1991 ===
Wim van Krimpen had started his career as fair director at the Rotterdam Ahoy in 1964, where he initiated a series of fairs in the fields of design, music and other entertainment. In his first year he initiated the interior fair Binnenhuis, which became an annual event for decades. The KunstRAI in Amsterdam initiated by him in 1984 was another of his success stories.

In 1978 Van Krimpen started his first own gallery in Amsterdam, initially under the name "Article". After a trip to the States he renamed it the "Van Krimpen gallery". From the start Van Krimpen represented a series of artists, such as Gunther Forg, Isa Genzken and Gunter Tuzina. In the last group exhibition of the gallery in 1991, they were also presented beside works of Paul Beckman, Rob Birza, Kees Smits, Elly Strik, and Ben Zegers.

Afterwards the location in Amsterdam was taken over by Dick Dankers and Cok de Rooy, who opened design gallery The Frozen Fountain in 1992.

=== Rotterdam at Westersingel 83, 1991 to 1994 ===
In 1991 the gallery moved to Rotterdam to a location at the Westersingel 83 at the corner of the Museum park, in those days still the beginning of the Marthenesserlaan. It was next to Museum Boijmans Van Beuningen, and formerly held the Galerie Fenna de Vries.

The new gallery out there was started in cooperation with the gallery Art & Project, who had also moved there from Amsterdam. The two galleries shared the ground floor of the townhouse, Van Krimpen occupied the first floor, and Art & Project the floor under the roof. During the opening exhibition the first exhibited large paintings by Günther Förg and the second edited photographs by Ger van Elk.

With the opening of the gallery in 1991 both art dealers praised the Rotterdam art climate because of the presence of existing galleries, such as Gallery Snoei, Gallery Rotta and Gallery RAM, and the art center Witte de With and the initiative for a new Nederlands Architectuurinstituut [NAI]. With the recession three years later the situation had completely turned around.

When Wim van Krimpen became a full-time director at the Kunsthal in Rotterdam in 1994, the gallery at the Westersingel was dissolved. At the same location the Centrum Beeldende Kunst Rotterdam started the exhibition space Villa Alckmaer, Rotterdam, which later moved down the street and became TENT Rotterdam. The location became part of the Museum Boijmans Van Beuningen.

=== Rotterdam at Nieuwe Binnenweg, 2010 ===
Wim van Krimpen made a further career as museum director in Leeuwarden and in The Hague. In 2010 the Wim van Krimpen galerie re-opened in Rotterdam at the Oude Binnenweg. The opening exhibition showed the work of contemporary art photographers, such as Ine Lamers and Paul Kooiker.

=== Prinsengracht in Amsterdam, 2012-2016 ===
First new location of the gallery in Amsterdam was at the Hazenstraat 20. Later it moved back to the Prinsengracht.

== Exhibitions, a selection ==
- 1991. Slot akkoord, Galerie Van Krimpen, Amsterdam.
