= Krimpen =

Krimpen may refer to:

== Places ==
- Krimpen aan de Lek, a town in Krimpenerwaard, South Holland, Netherlands
- Krimpen aan den IJssel, a town and municipality in South Holland, Netherlands

== People ==
- Jan van Krimpen (1892–1958), Dutch typographer and type designer
- Wim van Krimpen (born 1941), Dutch art dealer

== Games ==
- Krimpen (card game), an historical Austro-German card game
