= Folkert de Jong =

Dutch artist

- Born: 1972 (age 53–54); Egmond aan Zee, Netherlands
- Known for: Sculpture, Installation
- Awards: Prix de Rome (Netherlands) (2003)
- Website: studiofolkertdejong.com

Folkert de Jong (born 1972) is a Dutch artist. He makes large-scale sculptures and installations.

De Jong was born in Egmond aan Zee in the Netherlands. De Jong’s installations are life-size representations of disturbing scenes including human figures and props formed from materials such as polyurethane and Styrofoam; his work often features the uncanny and takes influence from the aesthetics of horror and the history of conflict, war and politics.

== Exhibitions ==
- Prix de Rome/Life's Illusions, 2004
- Golden Dawn, Peres Projects, Los Angeles, 2005
- Les Saltimbanques, James Cohan Gallery, New York, 2007
- Circle of Trust: Selected Works 2001-2009, Groninger Museum, Groningen, 2009
- Operation Harmony, James Cohan Gallery, New York, 2011
- The Immortals, Glasgow International Festival of Visual Art, 2012
- State of light, Louise Alexander Gallery, Porto Cervo, Italy, 2017
- Retrospective, Museum of Contemporary Art, Tucson, Arizona, USA, 2018

== Awards ==
- Prix de Rome, Sculpture, 2003
- KDR KunstRAI Prize, Amsterdam, 2004
