= Guido Geelen =

Dutch sculptor (born 1961)

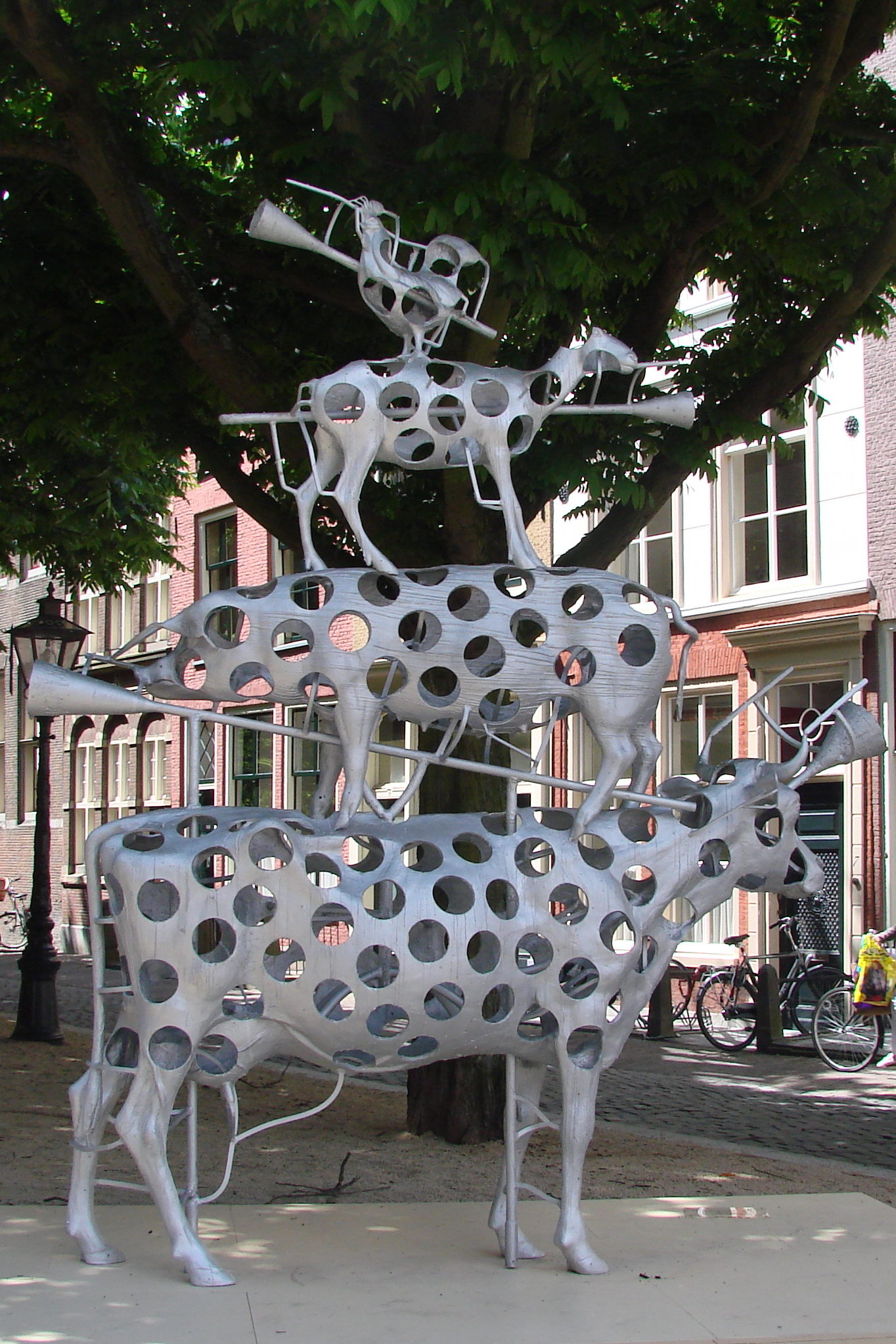
Animal sculpture, Leiden 2012.

Guido Jozef Marie Geelen (born 5 May 1961 in Thorn, Netherlands) is a Dutch sculptor, furniture designer and ceramist, who lives and works in Tilburg.

== Life and work ==
Geelen attended the Teachers' Academy in Tilburg from 1979 to 1983 and the Academie voor Beeldende Vorming Tilburg (ABV) from 1983 to 1985. After graduation, he started his own studio in Tilburg.

Geelen works primarily with clay. He creates images full of contradictions: order and chaos, severely and baroque, artisanal and industrial, simple and complex, art and kitsch. Many of his sculptures are constructed from clay reproductions of all kinds of objects: car tires, urinals, computers, televisions or vacuum cleaners. The still soft articles of clay have been pushed into a box and thus formed into rectangular blocks. Of these blocks built Geelen huge walls. The whole thing looks chaotic and yet neat. The tight confines of the wall contrast with the volatility caused by the play of light and shadow; the bizarre collections make the images exuberant and cheerful.

In 1989 Geelen was awarded the Charlotte Köhler Award, In 2000 he received the Dr. A.H. Heineken Prize for Art. for his unorthodox way of applying the traditional material of clay, giving the field a fresh impetus.

Several works by Geelen have been added to the collection of Museum De Pont in Tilburg.

== See also ==
- List of Dutch ceramists
- List of Dutch sculptors
