= KunstRAI =

KunstRAI is an annual art fair for modern and contemporary art held in spring or early summer at the RAI Exhibition and Convention Centre in Amsterdam, Netherlands. From 2006 to 2011 it was known as Art Amsterdam. The 2012 Art Amsterdam was to have been held at a different time and location but was cancelled; a KunstRAI did however take place in May 2012. Since 2016, each edition of KunstRAI has included a focus on a particular foreign city or country.

== KunstRAI ==
The fair, which encompasses post-war and contemporary art, has been held annually since 1985, traditionally in the second week of May. Wim van Krimpen founded the Art Fair Foundation with Martijn Sanders and was the first director; he was succeeded in 1989 by Jacob Witzenhausen, and then a year later by Erik Hermida. In 1992 the RAI Centre acquired the fair from the foundation. The fair was international in scope from the beginning and was a pioneer of European art fairs, few of which existed when it began. At RAI's request, Hermida introduced more of a Dutch national focus during his tenure.

== Art Amsterdam ==
Art Amsterdam was begun as a rival event in 1994 by galleries with a more radical and internationalist focus, originally in the former stock exchange building. In 1996, it merged with KunstRAI, and under Anneke Oele, the former curator of the Arnhem Museum of Modern Art, who became director in 2002, participation was reduced to a smaller number of galleries selected by a committee. Beginning in 2006, KunstRAI changed its name to Art Amsterdam to better reflect its international character and emphasise its connection to the city. In 2007, galleries showing crafts and ethnographica were excluded. The 25th anniversary fair, in 2009, was celebrated with the publication of an anniversary book and solo shows by all 120 participating galleries.

Edo Dijksterhuis, who became director with the 2010 fair succeeding Oele, instituted a section of special 25 square metre exhibit spaces for the more outrageous exhibits called "No Holds Barred".

The 26th fair, in 2011, was the first in the world to experiment with an online version, through Open Art Collection, in which 70 dealers offered works.

== Revival of KunstRAI ==
Hoping to raise the prestige of the fair and fit it better into the international art calendar, for the 27th edition in 2012 the organisers reduced the number of participating galleries from 135 to approximately 90, over one third of those from outside the Netherlands. They moved the time of the fair from May to September, and relocated it from the RAI Centre to the Kromhouthal, an event space in a former factory at the Nieuwendammerham in North Amsterdam. Since this format accommodated fewer Dutch galleries, the name KunstRAI was revived for an art fair in May at the RAI Centre under the former director Erik Hermida, at which 70 galleries, all from the Netherlands, showed art. This was more loosely organised; one gallery owner said: "It's a spontaneous fair with a lot of freedom... There are no rules, everybody can show what they want to." Having attracted fewer registrants than expected, Art Amsterdam 2012 was cancelled.

At the 2012 KunstRAI, international press attention was attracted by an artwork by Bart Jansen consisting of his dead cat, Orville, converted into a radio-controlled helicopter, the Orvillecopter.

Since 2016, with a focus on Berlin, each edition of KunstRAI has had a special focus on a foreign "guest city" or country, including Antwerp, Barcelona, Japan and Morocco.

Because of the COVID-19 pandemic, KunstRAI 2020 was twice postponed and then cancelled.

== Awards ==
The KDR KunstRAI prize for the young artist showing the most promise, later the Thieme Art Award, became the Lecturis Award in 2011. The 2011 winner was Edward Clydesdale Thomson; past winners have included Folkert de Jong, Karen Sargsyan, Rachid Ben Ali, Gijs van Lith and Jasper de Beijer.
