= Charlotte Köhler Prize =

Dutch art award

Charlotte Köhler Prize is a Dutch incentive award given to young talent (under the age of 35) in visual arts and theatre.

The prizes, €30,000 each, were established in 1988 in honour of the actress Charlotte Köhler and is annually given by the Prins Bernhard Cultuurfonds.

== Award winners (selected) ==
- Wiel Arets, 1988
- Berend Strik, 1990
- Ben van Berkel, 1991
- Joep van Lieshout, 1991
- Q.S. Serafijn, 1992
- Ben Zegers, 1994
- Job Koelewijn, 1996
- Barbara Visser (artist), 1996
- Yael Davids, 1997
- Guido Geelen, 2000
- Juul Hondius, 2002
- Marc Bijl, 2004
- Michel van der Aa, 2005
- Pere Faura, 2009
- Florian Idenburg, 2010
- Daan Roosegaarde, 2012
- Anouk Kruithof, 2014
- Alfred Schaffer (poet), 2017
- Manon Uphoff, 2020

== See also ==
- List of European art awards
