= Imaging Technology News =

Trade magazine

- Type: business magazine
- Format: Paper and online magazine
- Owner(s): Scranton Gillette Communications
- Editor: Melinda Taschetta-Millane
- Founded: 1961
- Language: English
- Headquarters: Arlington Heights, Illinois, USA
- Circulation: 34,901
- ISSN: 0361-4174
- Website: http://www.itnonline.com

Imaging Technology News (ITN) is a business-to-business trade publication serving healthcare professionals in the fields of radiology, radiation oncology, women’s health and nuclear medicine. ITN's print, website, and digital media cover trends in medical imaging, radiation, oncology, and technology.

The print publication had 34,901 subscribers as of July 2013.

ITN covers and exhibits the following organizations: Radiological Society of North America, the American Society for Therapeutic Radiology and Oncology, the Society of Nuclear Medicine and Molecular Imaging and the American Association of Physicists in Medicine.

== History ==
ITN launched in 1961 as Medical Electronics & Equipment News, which became MEEN in the 1980s. MEEN became Imaging Technology News in September 1999, which then became ITN in September 2011.
