= Rachid Ben Ali =

Moroccan-Dutch painter (born 1978)

- Born: 1978; Taza, Fez-Meknes, Morocco
- Known for: Painting

Rachid Ben Ali (born 1978 in Taza, Morocco) is a controversial Moroccan-Dutch painter.

At the age of 15 he was sent by his parents to the Netherlands. He is an autodidact. Later he attended the Polytechnic of the Arts in Antwerp, Belgium. He lives and works in Amsterdam and London.

In 2001 and 2003 he had shows in the Tanya Rumpff Gallery in Haarlem, the Stedelijk Museum in Amsterdam and the Wereldmuseum in Rotterdam. Queen Beatrix chose one of his paintings to introduce an exposition in the Stedelijk Museum.

In 2003 he won the KunstRAI award for young artists, and in 2005 40 of his most recent paintings were shown at the Cobra Museum of Modern Art in Amstelveen, near Amsterdam.

His work has triggered anger and threats from Islamist militants in the Netherlands. He went into hiding after death threats related to an exhibit showing "hate-imams" spitting bombs. Since then, he has required bodyguards, the cost of which are paid for by the Cobra Museum.
