= Daan van Golden =

Dutch artist (1936–2017)

Daniël (Daan) van Golden (4 February 1936 – 10 January 2017) was a Dutch artist, who has been active as a painter, photographer, collagist, installation artist, wall painter and graphic artist. He is known for his meticulous paintings of motives and details of everyday life and every day images.

== Biography ==
=== Youth, education and early career ===
Born on Katendrecht in Rotterdam in 1936, Van Golden was initially trained as fitter at a technical school from 1948 to 1950. On Sundays he received painting lessons from a Jesuit who was attached to the school.

From 1954 to 1959 he attended the evening courses at the Rotterdam Academy of Visual Arts (now Willem de Kooning Academy) at the painting department, where he also took classes in graphic art and design.

Van Golden started working as independent artist in Schiedam in 1961. Initially he was concerned with action painting and painted ferocious work with thickly applied black paint.

From 1963 to 1965 he made a two and a half-year trip to Japan, which turned his work around. There he came into contact with meditation and he realized that the human mind can find peace in watching simple form carefully. These simple shapes could simply be found in the everyday life.

=== Later career ===
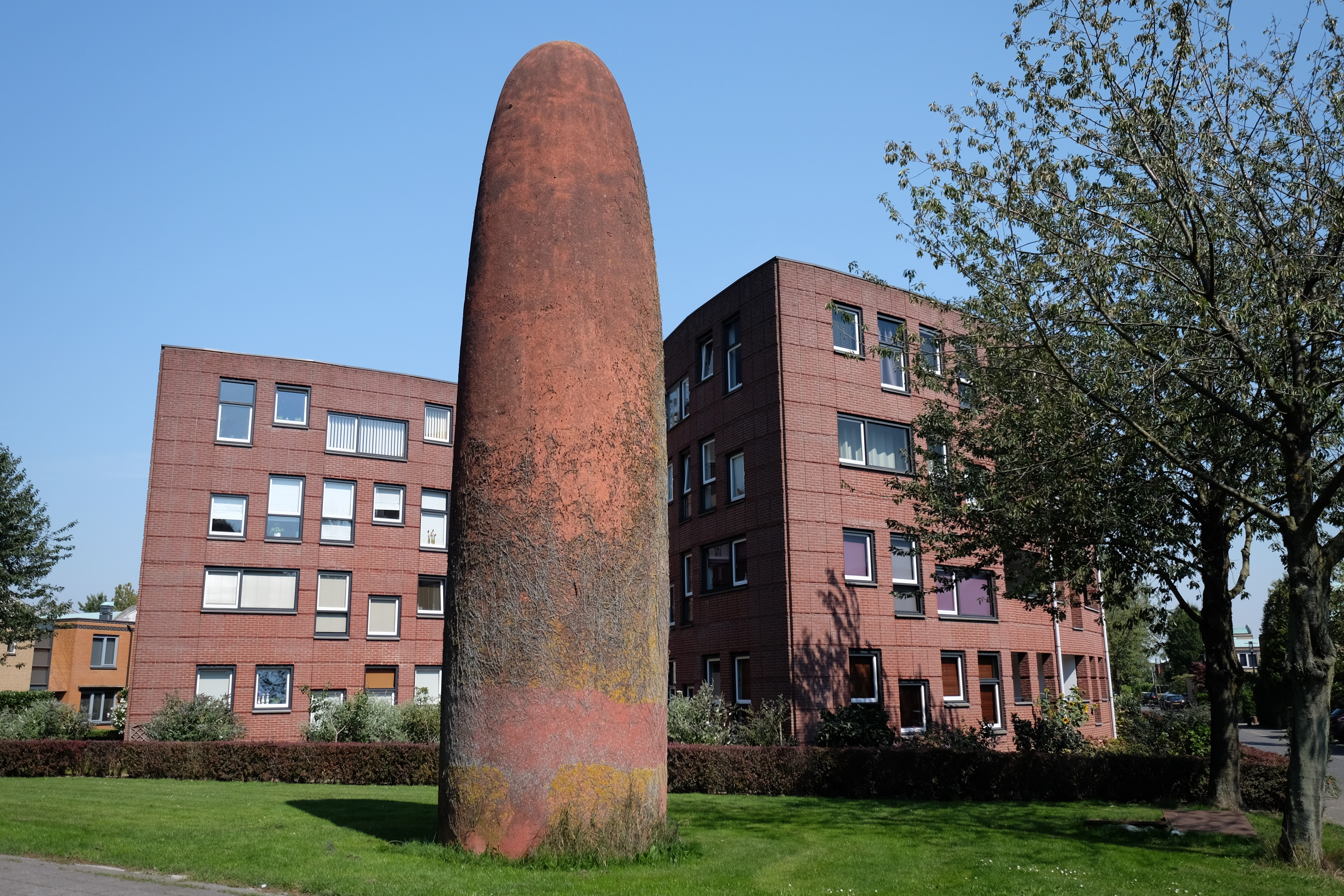
Menhir sculpture, Amersfoort 1995.

Upon returning to the Netherlands Daan van Golden started painting copies of brown packing paper to find peace of mind. This painting was the beginning of a series of works, created between 1963 and 1975, in which simple objects such as handkerchiefs, dishcloths, wrapping paper, tablecloths and other decorative material were repainted down to the smallest details.

After a period of painting diamond-shaped motifs, in a new period Van Golden dealt with copying public newspaper photographs, posters and advertisements. Hereby he made use of photography and screen printing technique. Later in the 1980s Van Golden became inspired by the drippings paintings of Jackson Pollock, which inspired him to create a series of paintings in which the silhouettes of paint drips minutely created strange characters.

In the early 1990s Golden turned to depicting silhouettes of photos and portraits. He copied painted profiles of Mozart. These silhouette paintings he mostly made in several versions. The personal style of the artist makes each painting unique, despite the compositional similarities with other paintings.

In 1987 Van Golden and Paul Beckman were awarded the Hendrik Chabot Award. In 1997 Van Golden was awarded the first Jordaan-van Heek Prijs, and the Dr A. H. Heineken Prize for Art in 2004. In 1999 he represented The Netherlands in Venice Biennale

Many of his works have been included in public and private collections abroad; his work may also be found in (Rijksdienst voor het Cultureel Erfgoed), Stedelijk Museum, Rijksmuseum Amsterdam, Museum Boijmans Van Beuningen and the Gemeentemuseum in The Hague.

== Work ==
Van Golden was influenced by pop art, abstract expressionism, minimalism and conceptual art. His paintings are realistic representations of subjects from mass production, but can be considered as abstract art as well. In his paintings of everyday objects, Golden deliberately chose to omit light and shade so that only the one-dimensional decorative motifs remained. The result was a selection of abstract paintings that consisted only of straight lines and flat color planes.

At the time of his death at Schiedam in early 2017 van Golden was still active. Due to a meticulous way of working, he made an average of only 3 to 4 pieces per year. He exhibited little and was regarded as a mysterious artist.

=== Exhibitions, a selection ===
- 1961. Gallery 't Venster, Rotterdam. Duo exhibition with Cornelis Bastiaan Vaandrager.
- 1965. Gallery 't Venster, Rotterdam.
- 1968. 4. documenta, Kassel.
- 1972. Relativerend realisme. Van Abbemuseum, Eindhoven.
- 1978. Schiedamse ateliers, Stedelijk Museum Schiedam.
- 1979. Art & Project, Amsterdam.
- 1982. Museum Boijmans Van Beuningen, Rotterdam.
- 1987. Century '87, Hortus Botanicus, Amsterdam.
- 1989. Bilderstreit, Rheinhalle Cologne.
- 1990. Rotterdam Assorti, HAL Rotterdam.
- 1991. De Kunst is geen wedstrijd, Arti et Amicitiae, Amsterdam.
- 1991. 7de Triennale, Lalit Kala Akademi, New Delhi.
- 1991. Stedelijk Museum Amsterdam.
- 1991. Reception for the artist. Gallery Bébert, Rotterdam.
- 1994. The wonder years: Rotterdamse beeldende kunst in de jaren zestig, Museum Boijmans Van Beuningen, Rotterdam.
- 1999. Daan van Golden. The pencil of nature, Venice Biennale, Dutch pavilion.

== Reception ==
The pioneering work of Van Golden of painting dishcloth motives was acknowledged in 1972, when his work was used as inspiration for poster of the exhibition "Illusion" in the Stedelijk Museum Schiedam. Harry Willemsen stated, that the pictorial approach of reality of Van Golden had become quite present in those days. In a 1986 newspaper article Jan Donia after an analyses of his work acknowledged, that of Van Golden held a unique position in the field of contemporary art. His work was a 'mysterie of imagination'.

== Publications ==
- Daan van Golden, Museum Boymans-Van Beuningen, Daan van Golden: overzichtstentoonstelling 1963–1982, 13 maart tot 26 April 1982, Museum Boymans-Van Beuningen, Rotterdam. 1982.
- Dippel, Rini, and Daan van Golden, Daan van Golden. Werken – Works, 1962–1991, Amsterdam: Stedelijk Museum, 1991.
- Daan van Golden, Museum Boijmans Van Beuningen (Rotterdam, Netherlands), Institut néerlandais (Paris, France), Youth is an art. 1997.
- Daan van Golden, H. W. van Os, Dante e Leonardo, 2006.
- Schampers, Karel, Daan van Golden. The pencil of nature, Rotterdam, 1999, ISBN 90-5662-107-6
