= Michel Dumontier =

- Born: 10 April 1975 (age 51); Winnipeg
- Citizenship: Canadian
- Education: University of Manitoba; University of Toronto
- Known for: Semanticscience Integrated Ontology, Bio2RDF
- Spouse: Tiffany Irene Leung
- Scientific career
- Fields: Bioinformatics, Biomedical Informatics, Ontology, Linked Data, Semantic Web
- Workplaces: Maastricht University
- Thesis: Species-specific optimizations of sequence and structure (2004)
- Doctoral advisor: Christopher W Hogue
- Website: http://dumontierlab.com

Michel Justin Dumontier (born 1975) is a Distinguished Professor of Data Science at Maastricht University. His research focuses on methods to represent knowledge on the web with applications for drug discovery and personalized medicine. He was previously an associate professor of medicine (Biomedical Informatics) at the Stanford University School of Medicine and an associate professor of bioinformatics at Carleton University. He is best known for his work in biomedical ontologies, linked data and biomedical knowledge discovery. He has taught courses on biochemistry, bioinformatics, computational systems biology, and translational medicine. His research has been funded by Natural Sciences and Engineering Research Council, Canada Foundation for Innovation, Mitacs Canada, the Ontario Ministry of Research, Innovation and Science, CANARIE, and the US National Institutes of Health. Dumontier has an h-index of over 30 and has authored over 125 scientific publications in journals and conferences. He lives in Maastricht with his wife Tifany Irene Leung and their lionhead rabbit Storm.

== Biography ==
Dumontier received his Bachelor of Science in biochemistry from the University of Manitoba in 1998. In his second year of undergraduate study, he joined the lab of James D. Jamieson where he developed a computational method to reconstruct the Golgi Apparatus. He then worked as research assistant at the Max Planck Institute of Biochemistry in Munich to investigate cellular dynamics of Rac1 protein of small GTPases. He defended his PhD in the department of biochemistry at the University of Toronto on the subject of "Species-specific optimizations of sequence and structure.". After a brief postdoctoral fellowship at the Blueprint Initiative, a project funded by Genome Canada and hosted in the Mount Sinai Hospital Research Institute, he joined the department of biology at Carleton University as an assistant professor in 2005. He was subsequently cross-appointed to the school of computer science and the Institute of Biochemistry and promoted to associate professor in 2009. In 2013, he joined the Stanford Center for Biomedical Informatics Research in the Stanford University School of Medicine. In 2017, he was appointed as a distinguished professor at Maastricht University in the Netherlands.
