= Het Cultuurfonds =

Dutch organization

The Cultuurfonds was founded by Prince Bernhard of The Netherlands in London in 1940 during World War II in order to buy war material for the British and Dutch Governments. It continued after the war as Stichting Prins Bernhard Cultuurfonds aiming to rebuild cultural life in the Netherlands.

Prins Bernhard Cultuurfonds gives out the Charlotte Köhler Prize, incentive awards given to young talent (under the age of 35) in visual arts and theatre. The prizes, €30,000 each, were established in 1988 in honour of the actress Charlotte Köhler.

In 1965 the (then) Prins Bernhard Fonds established the Anna Blaman Prijs, a literary award given to those who either live or work or have a close connection with the city of Rotterdam. The Prins Bernhard Cultuurfonds also created the Hendrik Chabot Prijs for visual arts and the Elly Ameling Prijs for music. As of 2016 the Elly Ameling Prijs is no longer awarded and the Prins Bernhard Cultuurfonds has handed over the organisation of the Anna Blaman Prijs to the Passionate Bulkboek organisation and the Hendrik Chabot Prijs to the Chabot Museum. The Cultuurfonds only awards Cultuurprijs Zuid-Holland every other year. In 2023, the fund changed its name to Cultuurfonds, removing the reference to Prince Bernhard following discovery of his NSDAP membership card.
