= Wim van Krimpen =

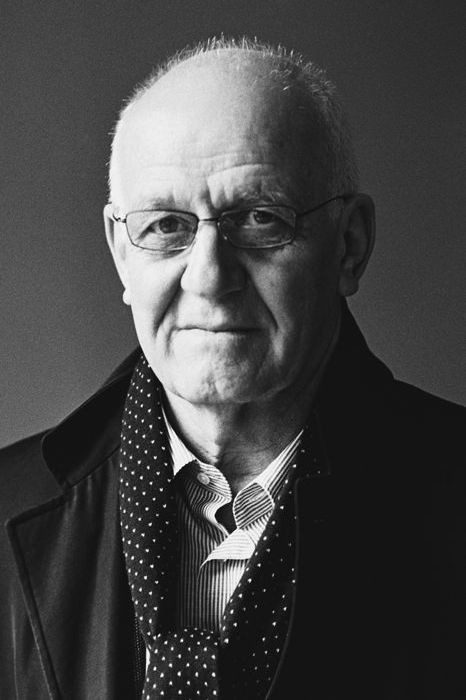
- Portrait by Helena van der Kraan, 2009-2011
- Born: 2 March 1941 (age 85); Groningen, Netherlands
- Occupations: Art historian; gallery owner; museum director
- Awards: Benno Premsela Prize
- Website: wimvankrimpen.nl

Wim van Krimpen (born in Groningen on 2 March 1941) is a Dutch art historian, art dealer and gallery owner of Galerie Wim van Krimpen, and art gallery director. He was director at the Kunsthal in Rotterdam, the Fries Museum in Leeuwarden and the Kunstmuseum Den Haag in The Hague.

== Biography ==
=== Youth and early career ===
Van Krimpen was the son of a Christian minister. After the war the family moved to Rotterdam, where he grew up. After studying law for a few years, in 1964 Van Krimpen became of director of the Binnenhuis Ahoy fair in Rotterdam.

In 1967 as director at the Rotterdam Ahoy Van Krimpen managed his first more prominent event, the Hippy Happy Beurs for teens and twens. Not only did he manage to bring Jimi Hendrix on stage in Rotterdam. There where performances of the Bee Gees, The Kinks, Keith West, Soft Machine and Pink Floyd as well.

In 1978 he started his first own gallery under the name Article. On a trip to the States he learned, that everybody out there had started under their own name, so he changed it into the Galerie Wim van Krimpen.

=== Later career ===
The galerie van Krimpen lasted two years in Amsterdam, and moved to Rotterdam in 1979. In 1988 he was appointed interim-directeur of the Kunsthal at that time yet to be built. Two year after its opening in 1992 he became its director until 1998. In 1998 he moved to the Fries Museum in Leeuwarden and in 2000 he was back in The Hague, where he served as director of the Kunstmuseum Den Haag until 2009.

In 2011 he was awarded the Benno Premsela Prize for his stimulating role in the field of visual arts, design or architecture.
