= American Society for Radiation Oncology =

ASTRO (the American Society for Radiation Oncology) is a professional association in radiation oncology that is dedicated to improving patient care through professional education and training, support for clinical practice and health policy standards, advancement of science and research, and advocacy. ASTRO has a membership of more than 10,000 members covering a range of professions including Radiation Oncologist, Radiation Therapists, Medical Dosimetrists Medical Physicists, Radiation Oncology Nurses and Radiation Biologists.

== Names ==
The organization began in 1958 as the American Club of Therapeutic Radiologists. In 1966 it became the American Society for Therapeutic Radiologists (ASTR). In 1983 it became ASTRO (the American Society for Therapeutic Radiology and Oncology). In 2008 it became ASTRO (the American Society for Radiation Oncology), keeping the acronym ASTRO while redefining its expansion. The members decided that the term "therapeutic radiology" was outdated and confusing to a general audience and that the new name would better reflect the specialty.

== Publications ==
ASTRO publishes a weekly electronic newsletter called the ASTROgram and a quarterly magazine called the ASTROnews.

ASTRO has a scientific publishing program that includes three peer-reviewed journals.

The International Journal of Radiation*Oncology*Biology*Physics (Int J Radiat Oncol Biol Phys), also known as the Red Journal, is published 15 times each year.

In 2011, ASTRO began publishing Practical Radiation Oncology. Also called P.R.O., it is a journal whose mission is to improve the quality of radiation oncology practice.

ASTRO launched an online only open access (OA) journal in 2015 called Advances in Radiation Oncology as a sister journal to Red Journal and PRO. It also publishes teaching cases and brief communications in radiation oncology.
