= Irma Boom =

Dutch graphic designer (born 1960)

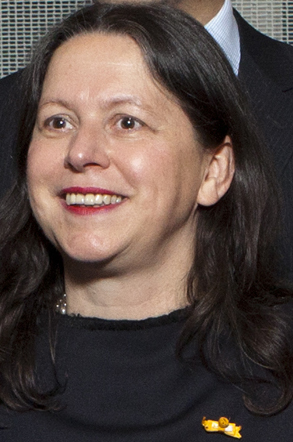
- Boom in 2013
- Born: 15 December 1960 (age 65); Lochem, Gelderland, Netherlands
- Education: AKI Art Academy
- Known for: Graphic design
- Awards: Gutenberg Prize, 2001
- Website: irmaboom.nl

Irma Boom (born 15 December 1960) is a Dutch graphic designer who specializes in bookmaking. Boom has been described as the "Queen of Books," having created over 500 books and is well reputed for her artistic autonomy within her field. Her bold experimental approach to her projects often challenges the convention of traditional books in both physical design and printed content.

Boom has been noted as the youngest recipient of the Gutenberg Prize, an award recognizing outstanding services to the advancement of the book arts. A selection of Boom's books are held in the permanent collection of MoMA, and a personalized Irma Boom Archive has been set up at the University of Amsterdam, Netherlands, showcasing Boom's work.

== Biography ==
Born in Lochem, The Netherlands in 1960, Boom was the youngest child of nine in her family. Her venture into book design came by accident while pursuing painting at the AKI Academy of Art & Design. Boom had walked into a lecture on book design, and so profound was its impact that it inspired her to drop painting and join the graphic design department. Here she found a love for Swiss typography and began developing her creative voice.

Boom attended the AKI art academy in Enschede, Netherlands, where she pursued a B.F.A in graphic design. During this time she interned at various offices including the Dutch Government Publishing and Printing Office in The Hague, Studio Dumbar, and The Dutch Television (NOS) design department. Boom had applied to intern at Total Design in Amsterdam, where Wim Crouwel was director, but had been rejected by his colleagues for mixing too many typefaces. Her work was far too experimental for a firm that was used to strict typographic convention.

Boom experienced her first job as both an editor and designer during her time at the Dutch Government Publishing and Printing Office in The Hague. It was here that she was noticed by Ootje Oxenaar, a designer of Dutch banknotes, who invited her to design two catalogues for special edition postage stamps between years 1987 and 1988. To him, she was the 'designer of the crazy ads'. The annual Dutch postage stamp books was considered a prestigious opportunity with previous designers had including Wim Crouwel, Karel Martens, and Gert Dumbar. Boom's experimental style was evident in this particular publication, through the rich layers of information and imagery. Boom structured the book in a Japanese style binding and had text crossing multiple pages with printed folds and translucent paper. Though well received by Oxenaar, this project drew a lot of public outcry for being overtly experimental in comparison to previous editions. Boom received much hate mail, particularly from stamp collectors. However, this controversy brought her name into the public stage and established her name as a designer.

Upon graduating during the 1980s, Boom decided to return to the Dutch Government Publishing and Printing Office where she worked for another five and a half years. It gave her the opportunity to jump right into the shoes of a designer rather than an assistant designer. During this time she became acquainted with Paul Fentener van Vlissingen who would invite her to design the SHV thinkbook—a book which eventually elevated her status to a design star.

Boom founded the Irma Boom Office in Amsterdam in 1991. She continued to tackle projects nationally and internationally in both the cultural and commercial sectors. Since 1992, she has been a critic at Yale University, and has both lectured and given workshops worldwide. She had also tutored at Jan van Eyck Academie, Masstricht in the Netherlands between 1998 and 2000. Her work has been shown at numerous international exhibitions, including her own solo exhibition in Amsterdam in 2011. She had been a member of the Supervisory Board Gerrit Rietveld Academy in Amsterdam between 2004 and 2011 and has been a member of the board Premsela Foundation, Amsterdam since 2008.

== Building books ==
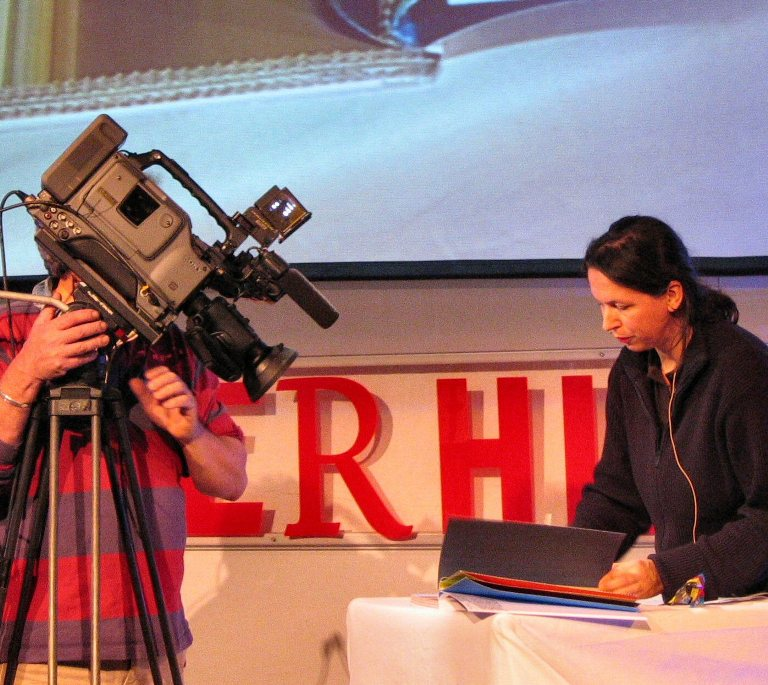
Irma Boom presenting her book Grafisch Nederland 2005 Kleur/Colour at the University of Amsterdam, November 2004

Boom's books take on an architectural form and she views them as a unique medium for delivery of information. A thorough reflection of a book's content leads Boom to her design decisions. It is her aim to enhance the readers' understanding while at the same time creating an object of beauty, with quality and permanence. Boom considers the entire landscape of the book including the edges. She builds three-dimensional models in miniature scale to aid in the development of her books. From typography to material, every detail Boom applies to her projects possesses an underlying logic.

Unconventional typographic trademarks of Boom may include the use of oversized type which successively shrinks from the opening to end of her book. This claims is a way to lure people into reading the introductory pages.

Boom also makes use of various finishing in her printed material such as embossing and die cuts. In her commissioned book for Chanel, Chanel N ͦ5, Boom printed an entire 300 page book devoid of ink, using instead embossed text and image to create a semi-invisible narrative of Gabrielle "Coco" Chanel. The book is completely white and housed in a black box. The concept behind the book was inspired by the nature of perfume—it is best understood in an olfactive, not visual, manner—and relies on lesser dominant senses to tell the story.

Scent is another unusual feature Boom has utilized in her book design. Her conceptual book design for The Road Not Taken has 718 pages printed using ink mixed with a base of beef bouillon. Coffee filter paper is another unusual material choice.

Creating a sensory tactile experience when designing and making books is very important to Boom and she aims to inspire discovery and interaction. Some of the ways she does this is through publishing books without page numbers or indexes. She has also published books printed in reversed chronological order. Some of her book covers may be left white or blank, or her book's scale may be distorted in size and thickness. Inner pages may have elaborately chosen colour codes or hidden motifs. Every detail is analyzed to maximize its engagement potential.

Boom introduced the idea of a 'fat book'; that is, books that are remarkably thick. When asked what would make her create a book that was two inches tall and half as thick, she replied:

The book is small because whenever I make a book, I start by making a tiny one. Usually I make five, six or seven for each book, as filters for my ideas and to help me to see the structure clearly. I have hundreds of those small books and am so fond of them. I've always wanted to make one for publication, but no one has ever wanted to do it. And I thought, well, this time, I can.

Titled Irma Boom: The Architecture of the Book, it contains 800 pages and 515 images. She has received extensive media coverage of her work, and Alice Rawsthorn writing for the New York Times profiled her in 2010.

Boom has designed most of her books with creative freedom in her designs. She designed a book titled Beautiful Ugly by Sarah Nuttall, with an olive-green colored cover and no pictures or text. "The book was designed in Amsterdam by Irma Boom, and I thank her for her extraordinary eye and prodigious talent for making books beautiful."

== Notable books ==
Irma Boom has created over 200 books. A selection of her books can be found at the permanent collection of the Architecture & Design department, MoMA.

=== SHV thinkbook 1996-1896 ===
This book was the landmark book of Boom's career. The 2,136 page book was worked on for a span of five years before being published in 1996. Three and a half years were dedicated to intense research in Amsterdam, Paris, London and Vienna. It contains no index or page numbers and is anti-chronological. This was to encourage readers to approach the book without constraints, but rather surprise and discovery. Tulip fields and a Dutch poem were incorporated into the edges of the book, viewable depending on the direction in which each page is flipped. It is an unusually thick book measuring 22.5 x 17 x 11 cm. It started with Boom being asked to 'look for the unusual'. It was created with the editorial of art historian Johan Pijnappel. Initially there had been consideration in publishing the content as a CD-ROM, but a book proved to be a more timeless and opportunistic option. The book's entirely white cover reveals a title as it dirties with use over time. An alternate version comes in black. Transparent adhesive had been typographically applied to collect dust and fingerprints. Creating a book with a blank cover alarmed publishers at the time but their unease presumably disappeared after the book's release, as it elevated Boom to international design stardom. The anniversary book was one of her biggest and communicated a narrative on the history of that company. It was designed to be distributed worldwide, yet Boom has calculated that it will take five hundred years for the book to spread to all the corners of the globe. Four thousand copies were printed in English and five hundred in Chinese. It has been described as an international icon of Dutch design. It is part of the permanent collection of MoMA.

=== Weaving as Metaphor, Sheila Hicks ===
Boom was commissioned to create a book on the American textile and fiber artist Sheila Hicks to accompany a solo exhibition on Hicks' work at Bard Graduate Center entitled "Sheila Hicks: Weaving as Metaphor." The book was published in 2006 and was awarded a gold medal as 'The Most Beautiful Book in the World' at the Leipzig Book Fair. This book again troubled publishers for its blank cover, warning that an image is needed or it would not sell. Boom rejected a request to have the artists work on the cover stating that Hicks is an interesting artist who deserves a bigger audience, therefore is in need of a more abstract cover. The book was designed with a simple layout: text on the left, image centred on the right. Of particular note on this book are the edges, which are jagged and frayed. A circular hacksaw was introduced into the production process to create these edges, which mimicked the selvedges of Hick's textile work. It measures at 22 x 15.5 x 5.6 cm and is part of the permanent collection at MoMA.

=== N°5 Culture Chanel ===
For Chanel's 2013 exhibition at the Palais de Tokyo in Paris, Boom created a book filled with solid white, textural pages. The 300 page book was printed devoid of ink, instead embossed with text and image creating a semi-invisible narrative for Gabrielle "Coco" Chanel. The book structure is housed in a black box. The concept behind the book was inspired by the nature of perfume—it is best understood in an olfactive, not visual, manner—and relies on lesser dominant senses to convey the essence of the Chanel N ͦ5 fragrance. Its content came from the world of Mlle. It won the Dutch Design Awards in 2013 and is part of the permanent collection at MoMA.

=== Irma Boom: The Architecture of the Book ===
Featuring an overview of Boom's work are two 800 page identical copies of extremely contrast in size, published in 2010. The Boom book comes in a miniature (41.4 x 54.0mm, 55g) and an XXL edition (345 x 455mm, 7.5 kg). They both complement each other in that the larger version reveals hidden touches that cannot be seen in the minuscule. The books have coloured edges and are soft-cover bound with faux leather. Both include a specimen of the Chanel N ͦ5 book, with blind embossing. Other finishings include hot foil. The XXL is available in a limited edition of 150 numbered and signed copies. The miniature became a huge print success. Despite its size, it reads well. Boom had often dreamed of publishing at such a scale but the idea had as per usual been too unconventional and alarming to publishers. Her miniature is simply a model of her design process. She works builds books in small scale before evolving their size. It is part of the permanent collection at MoMA.

== Commissions & clients ==
Boom's clients include the Rijksmuseum in Amsterdam, Inside Outside, The Museum of Modern Art New York, Prince Claus Fund, Fondazione Prada, Maserati, OMA/Rem Koolhaas, Yale University Press (London)/Bard Graduate Center (New York), Serpentine Gallery, Wiel Arets, Chanel, Paul Fentener van Vlissingen, Museum Boijmans, Zumtobel, Ferrari, Vitra International, NAi Publishers, United Nations, Koninklijke Tichelaar, Makkum, Aga Khan Foundation and Camper.

Boom is very selective of her projects, and collaborations. She is particular in acting roles while taking on projects:

I never talk about clients, by the way. I have 'commissioners'. I think with a client, the designer works for them. So instead I have commissioners I work with. The commissioner is on an equal level as the designer. Not like, 'I'm paying you—you do this for me.' To you, the 'commissioner' feels like we're talking about an artist, but in the Netherlands, a commissioner is someone you—I say—work with.

She maintains that books are a collaborative effort, requiring trust and freedom between the commissioner and the designer.

== Collections ==
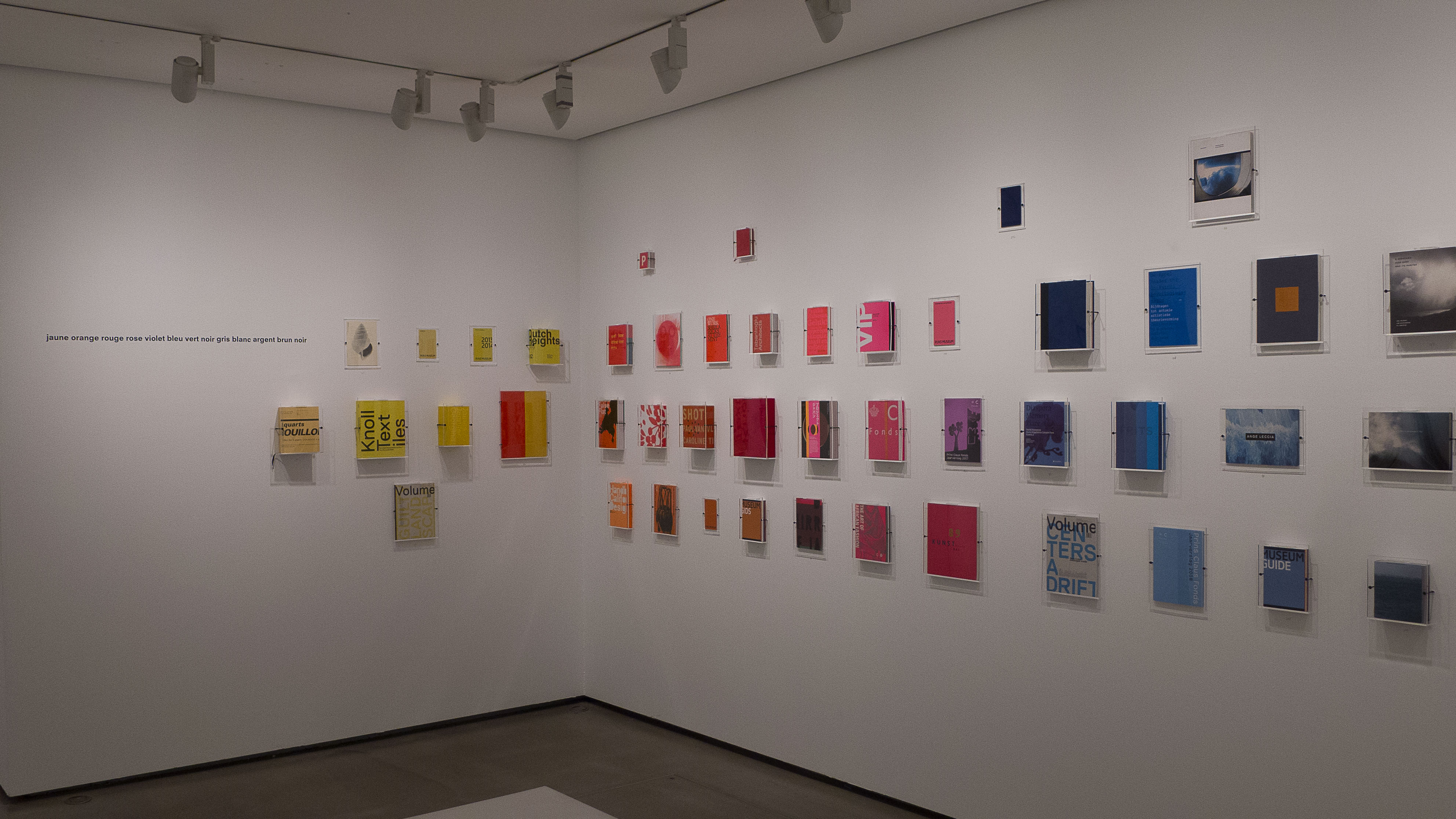
Boom's work exhibited at the Netherlands Institute for Multiparty Democracy in 2013

- Museum of Modern Art, New York – Selection of books at the permanent collection of the Architecture & Design department
- University of Amsterdam – Irma Boom Collection in the Special Collections of the Library of the University of Amsterdam
- Centre Pompidou, Musée national d'arty modern, Paris – Permanent collection of Bibliothèque Kandinsky

== Select awards & honors ==
Boom has over 50 awards and honors and nominations received between 1989 and the present.

- 1997: Rotterdam Design Prize, Honorable Mention for "SHV-book"
- 2001: Gutenberg Prize for oeuvre (Leipzig)
- 2000: Gold Medaille "Schönste Bücher Aller Welt", Leipzig (cat. World Wide Video, 1998)
- 2002: Silver Medaille "Schönste Bücher Aller Welt", Leipzig (cat. Rijnlands Huis, 2001)
- 2003: Gold Medaille "Schönste Bücher Aller Welt", Leipzig with Kristina Brusa (Irma Boom, Gutenberg Galaxie 2, 2003)
- 2006: Golden Bee Award, Colour book 5 centuries art
- 2007: Gold Medal, Most Beautiful Book in the World, for the publication Sheila Hicks: Weaving as Metaphor (2006), Leipzig Book Fair
- 2009: AIGA Best Book (Design and the Elastic Mind)
- 2011: AIGA Best Books, New York (Irma Boom: Biography in Books)
- 2011: D&AD, London (Irma Boom: Biography in Books)
- 2012: Amsterdam Prize for oeuvre
- 2012: House of Orange, Honorary Medal for Art and Science, honour of Queen Beatrix 2012 AAM Museum Publications Design Competition, First Prize (USA) (Knoll Textiles)
- 2012: Herzog & De Meuron, Architectural Book Award 2012 of the German Museum of Architecture, Frankfurt
- 2013: Auto Biographical References/Wiel Arets
- 2016: 50 Books | 50 Covers award from the AIGA for the cover design of the book "Artek and the Aaltos: Creating a Modern World" (2016).

== Quotes ==
- Sometimes I see books, and I think, Well, it could have been a PDF. The regular book is not alive anymore. You can put it on a PDF on the internet, or on a Kindle or iPad, and it's the same. But my books are something else. They have to be this three-dimensional object. Somebody once said that I'm building books. I really like that expression very much.
- I compare my work to architecture. I don't build villas, I build social housing. The books are industrially made and they need to be made very well. It's never art. Never, never, never.
- In older days, a book was made for spreading information, but now we have the internet to spread information. So to spread something else, maybe sheer beauty or a much slower more thought provoking message – it's the book.
- Stay close to your own ideas.

== Sources ==
- Print; Aug 2011, Vol. 65 Issue 4, p 18-18, 1p
