= Wieki Somers =

Dutch designer

- Born: 16 September 1976 (age 50)
- Education: Design Academy Eindhoven, European Ceramics Work Center
- Occupations: Designer, ceramics designer, industrial designer
- Awards: Dutch Design Award 'Habitat' (Merry-Go-Round Coat rack, 2009)
- Website: studiowiekisomers.com

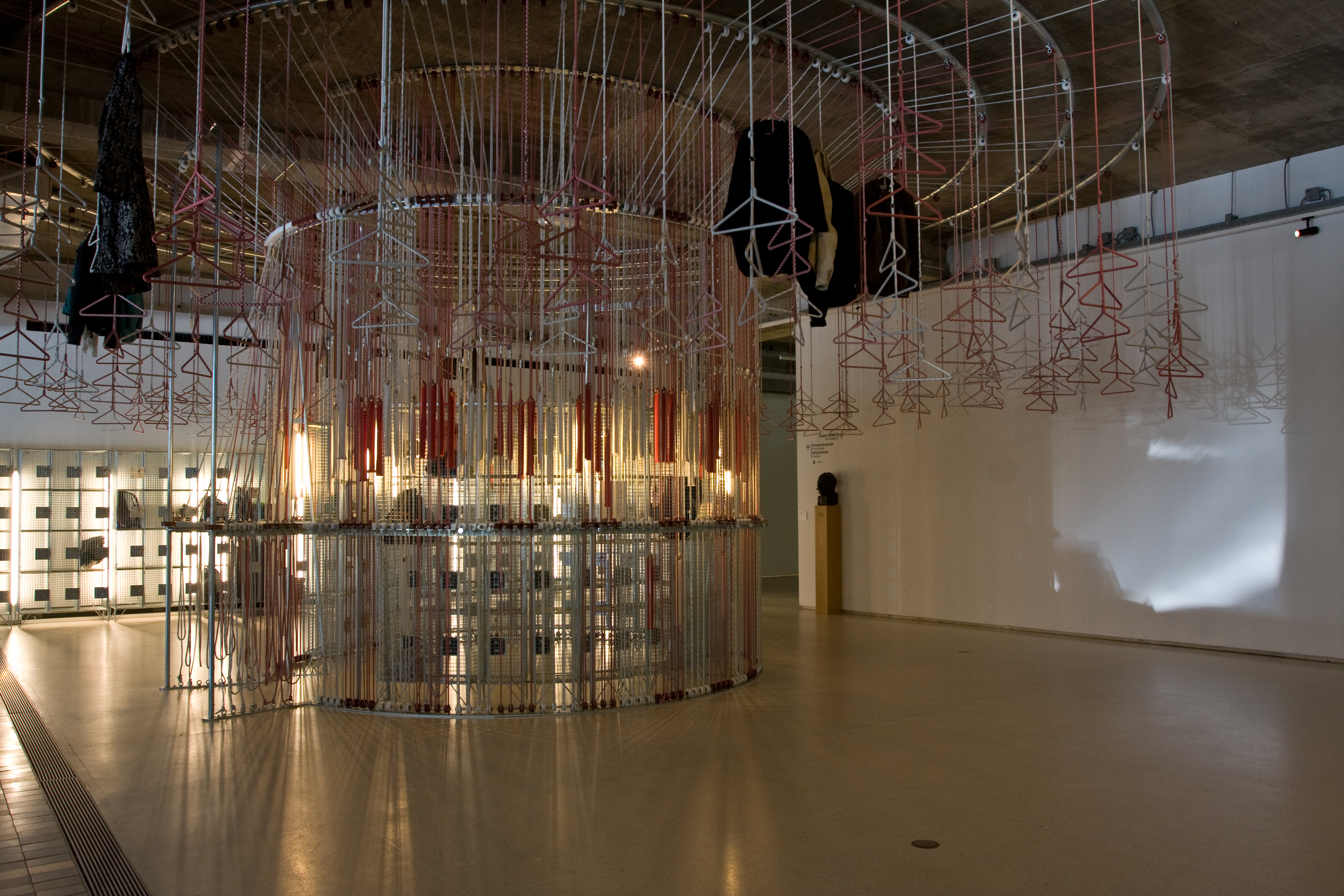
The Merry-go-round Coat Rack in the cloakroom at Museum Boijmans Van Beuningen

Wieki Somers (born 1976 in Sprang-Capelle) is a Dutch designer. She works together with Dylan van den Berg under the name Studio Wieki Somers. Somers is considered part of the second generation of Dutch designers who have gained international acclaim. Unlike the first generation of Dutch designers, who have focused mainly on conceptual, functional designs, this second generation also recognizes the importance of aesthetics. Her work consists of using everyday items newly realized with the incorporation of foreign material, form, technology, or function, and poetry. Somers strives to create pieces to trigger the user's imagination and heighten awareness. Her personal outlook on life is reflected in her approach to design. “I like realizing the potential of everyday things by revealing their hidden beauty.”

In October 2009, Studio Wieki Somers won the Golden Eye (the award for best Dutch design) at the Dutch Design Awards with the Merry-go-round Coat Rack, designed for the cloakroom of Museum Boijmans Van Beuningen in Rotterdam. By pulling ropes, coats are raised onto the carousel-like construction, making them appear to be floating in space. The coat rack was also nominated in 2009 at the London Design Museum's Designs of the Year awards.

While some work is outsourced, designing and prototyping in her workshop allows Somers to iterate and apply research for herself. Many of her works, early and now, incorporate the work of specialized artisans, such as her Bathboat. Bellflower Lamp, a woven carbon-and-glass fiber fabric woven using a process developed for the aerospace industry, in the shape of a flower. Other well-known designs by Somers include the High Tea Pot, shaped like a pig's skull and accompanied by a fur cosy; the Bathboat, a bathtub shaped like a rowing boat; and the Bellflower, a two-metre-tall lamp woven out of a single piece of fabric using an experimental weaving technique. She has also turned her attention to the world of textiles, designing the patterns of luxury carpets. In 2007, Somers was commissioned by the Gemeentemuseum Den Haag in The Hague to design a tulip vase, Faded Glory.

The Rotterdam-based design centre VIVID showed an exhibition of her work from November 2005 to January 2006. Also taking place in Rotterdam, the Museum Boijmans Van Beuningen featured "Out of the Ordinary" in 2014. It was later shown in Lausanne, Switzerland at MUDAC from October 2017 to February 2018. And in January–March 2010, Galerie kreo in Paris presented Wieki Somers: Frozen in Time, an exhibition of objects designed by Somers that were inspired by photographs of an ice-storm in the northeastern Netherlands on March 2, 1987. In 2013, Galerie kreo showed the "Mitate" collection by the designer. Sommers also participated in Galerie Kreo's Step by Step exhibition in 2022.

Somers work was also showcased in an exhibit curated by Droog Design, a Dutch design group, to create From Lille With Love. The exhibit, within the European Capital of Culture, was an artificial garden featuring a tree house where visitors can look out over the space. Droog tasked designers to build on the heritage of the site to design glass, ceramics, and textiles.

Somers graduated from the Design Academy Eindhoven in 2000 – a generation after Hella Jongerius, Jurgen Bey, and Marcel Wanders.

In addition to her previous design study, she has taught at Design Academy Eindhoven. Somers was honored by the Stedelijk Museum 's-Hertogenbosch with a survey of her projects, from December 13, 2008, to February 15, 2009. Somers is the new addition of 30 artists represented by Didier Krzentowski, an acclaimed accumulator of art and gallery owner in Paris, France. Her work is collected by museums including the Museum of Modern Art in New York, the Centre Pompidou in Paris, Museum Boijmans Van Beuningen in Rotterdam and the Victoria and Albert Museum in London.
