= Piet Zwart Award =

- Awarded for: Dutch designers
- Country: Netherlands
- Presented by: Association of Dutch Designers
- Established: 1983

The Piet Zwart Award, or BNO Piet Zwart Award (Dutch: BNO Piet Zwart Prijs) is a Dutch design award, founded in 1983, and named after Dutch architect and industrial designer Piet Zwart (1885–1977).

== History ==
It is organized by the Association of Dutch Designers (Dutch: Beroepsorganisatie Nederlandse Ontwerpers, or BNO), to honour designers who have made an impact in their profession and expertise, thus becoming a role model for younger generations. The prize was initiated in 1983 by the Dutch design bureau Total Design and transferred to BNO in the 1990s. In 2003, it was made part of the Dutch Design Awards.

The award trophy is a three-dimensional sculptural version of Piet Zwart's signature, and has been designed by Paul Mijksenaar.

A designer's work must fall into at least one of the following criteria to be considered for a prize:

1. Excellent work in one or more design disciplines
2. Exceptional contributions to the significance and prestige of the field
3. Example and inspiration to the next generation(s) of designers

== Winners ==
- 1983, Friso Kramer, industrial designer
- 1985, Jan van Toorn, graphic designer
- 1991, Wim Crouwel, graphic designer
- 1994, Eva Besnyö, photographer
- 1998, Nel Verschuuren, spatial designer
- 2003, Jan Bons, graphic designer
- 2008, Bruno Ninaber van Eyben, jewellery and industrial designer
- 2009, Gert Dumbar, graphic designer
- 2010, Willem Diepraam, photographer
- 2011, Marijke van der Wijst, interior architect and exhibition designer
- 2012, Gerard Unger, graphic and type designer
- 2013, Ulf Moritz, textile and interior designer
- 2015, Paul Mijksenaar, designer of visual information
- 2017, LUST, design collective
- 2019, Frans Bevers, spatial designer
- 2021, Hella Jongerius, industrial designer
- 2023, Karel Martens, graphic designer
- 2025, not awarded
