= Dutch Design Week =

Dutch Design Week (DDW)
- Genre: Design Festival, Exhibition
- Frequency: Annually
- Location: Eindhoven
- Inaugurated: 2002
- Previous event: 2024
- Next event: 18-26 October 2025
- Participants: Over 2600
- Organizer: Dutch Design Foundation
- Website: https://ddw.nl

Dutch Design Week (also known as DDW) is an event about Dutch design, hosted in Eindhoven, Netherlands. The event takes place around the last week of October and is a nine-day event with exhibitions, studio visits, workshops, seminars, and parties across the city.

The event hosts companies including Philips, Philips Design and DAF, as well as the Design Academy Eindhoven and the Eindhoven University of Technology.

The initiative began in 2002 as a non-commercial fair and by 2018 had 355,000 visitors.

The DDW consists of around 120 venues. The main venues during the event are among others the Klokgebouw (Strijp-S), Design Academy Eindhoven and the Faculty of Industrial Design at the Eindhoven University of Technology, where successful and well-visited expositions are organized.

Whereas the main goal remains to create a non-commercial event, many conflicts of interest and the rapid growth did contribute to a more commercial approach since 2007.

Pop venue Effenaar and classical music venue Muziekgebouw Frits Philips both organize the musical program DDW Music around the festival with live performances as well as exhibitions related to experimental musical instruments, sound art and sound installations.

Dutch Design Week 2020 was an online-only event. A digital festival, initially planned to work alongside a programme of studio tours and socially distanced activities, became the centrepiece of the festival as all physical events had been cancelled due to a rise in coronavirus cases in the city.

== Theme ==
Since the 2012 edition Dutch Design Week picks a yearly theme overarching the entire week.

Dutch Design Week themes
| Year | Theme |
|---|---|
| 2012 | Enter a Brave new World |
| 2013 | Now Future |
| 2014 | UP |
| 2015 | What if... |
| 2016 | The Making of |
| 2017 | Stretch |
| 2018 | If not us, then who? |
| 2019 | If not now, then when? |
| 2020 | The New Intimacy |
| 2021 | The Greater Number |
| 2022 | Get Set |
| 2023 | Picture This |
| 2024 | Real Unreal |

== Ambassadors ==
Since 2009 Dutch Design Week picks multiple ambassadors from the field who are advocates of Dutch Design.

Dutch Design Week Ambassadors
| Year | Ambassadors |
|---|---|
| 2009 | Leonne Cuppen |
| 2010 | Roland Bird, Marijn van der Poll |
| 2011 | Miriam van der Lubbe, Bruno Ninaber van Eyben |
| 2012 | Robert Bronwasser, Joost van Bleiswijk, Kiki van Eijk |
| 2013 | Daan Roosegaarde, Piet Hein Eek |
| 2014 | Scholten & Baijings, Arne Hendriks |
| 2015 | Makkink & Bey, Koert van Mensvoort |
| 2016 | Maarten Baas & Bas van Abel |
| 2017 | Marcus Fairs, Winy Maas, Lonny van Ryswyck, Nadine Sterk |
| 2018 | Ravi Naidoo, Wendy Plomp, Laurens van den Acker |
| 2019 | Stefano Boeri, Alice Rawsthorn, Jalila Essaïdi, Lonneke Gordijn, Ralph Nauta |
| 2020 | Lideweij Edelkoort, Sabine Marcelis, Sean Carney |
| 2021 | Floris Alkemade, Natsai Audrey Chieza, Christien Meindertsma |
| 2022 | Formafantasma, Marjan van Aubel |
| 2023 | Yinka Ilori, Muzus, Stefan Diez |

== See also ==
- Dutch Design
