= Dutch Design =

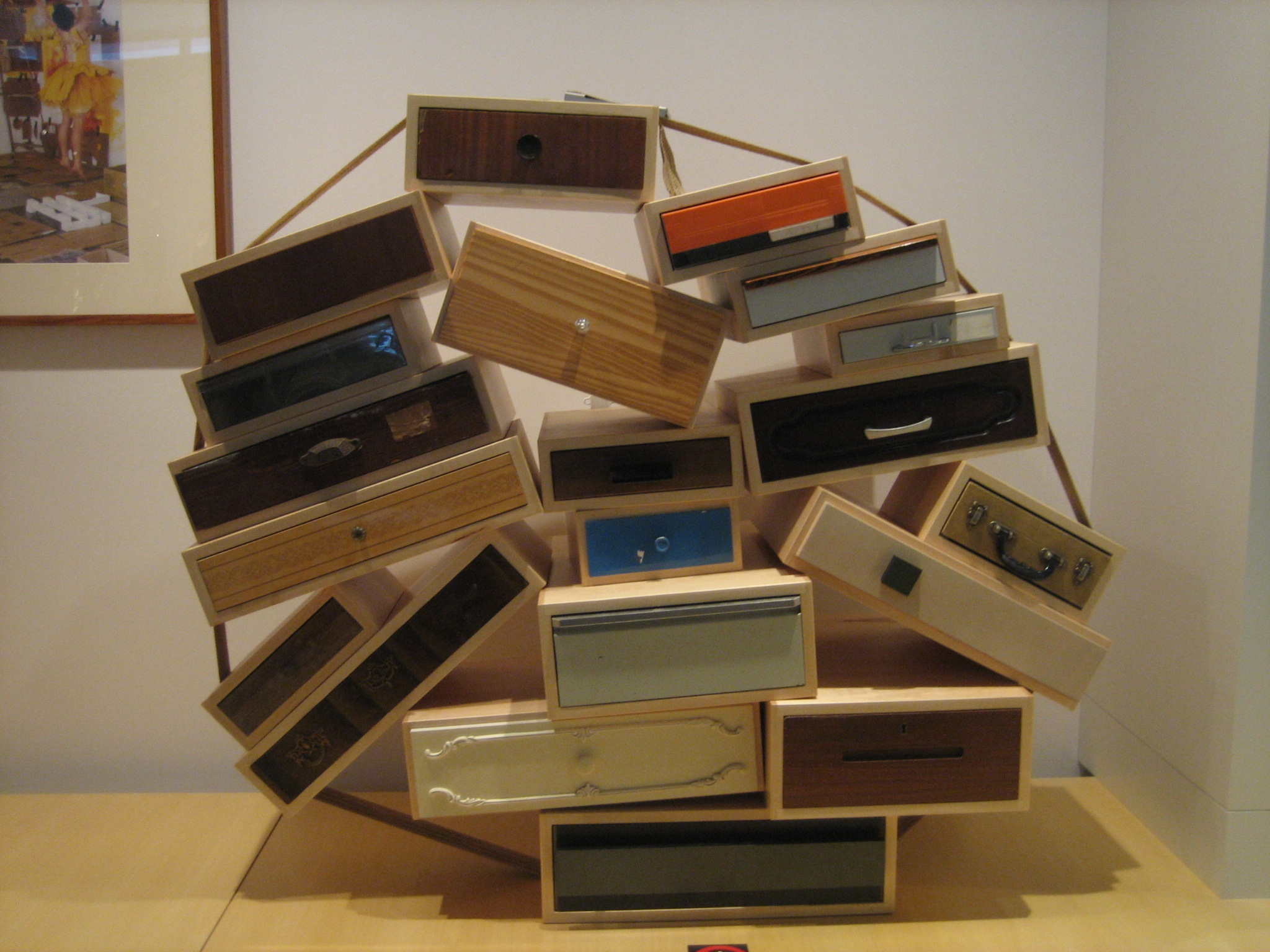
Tejo Remy: Chest of Drawers (1991)

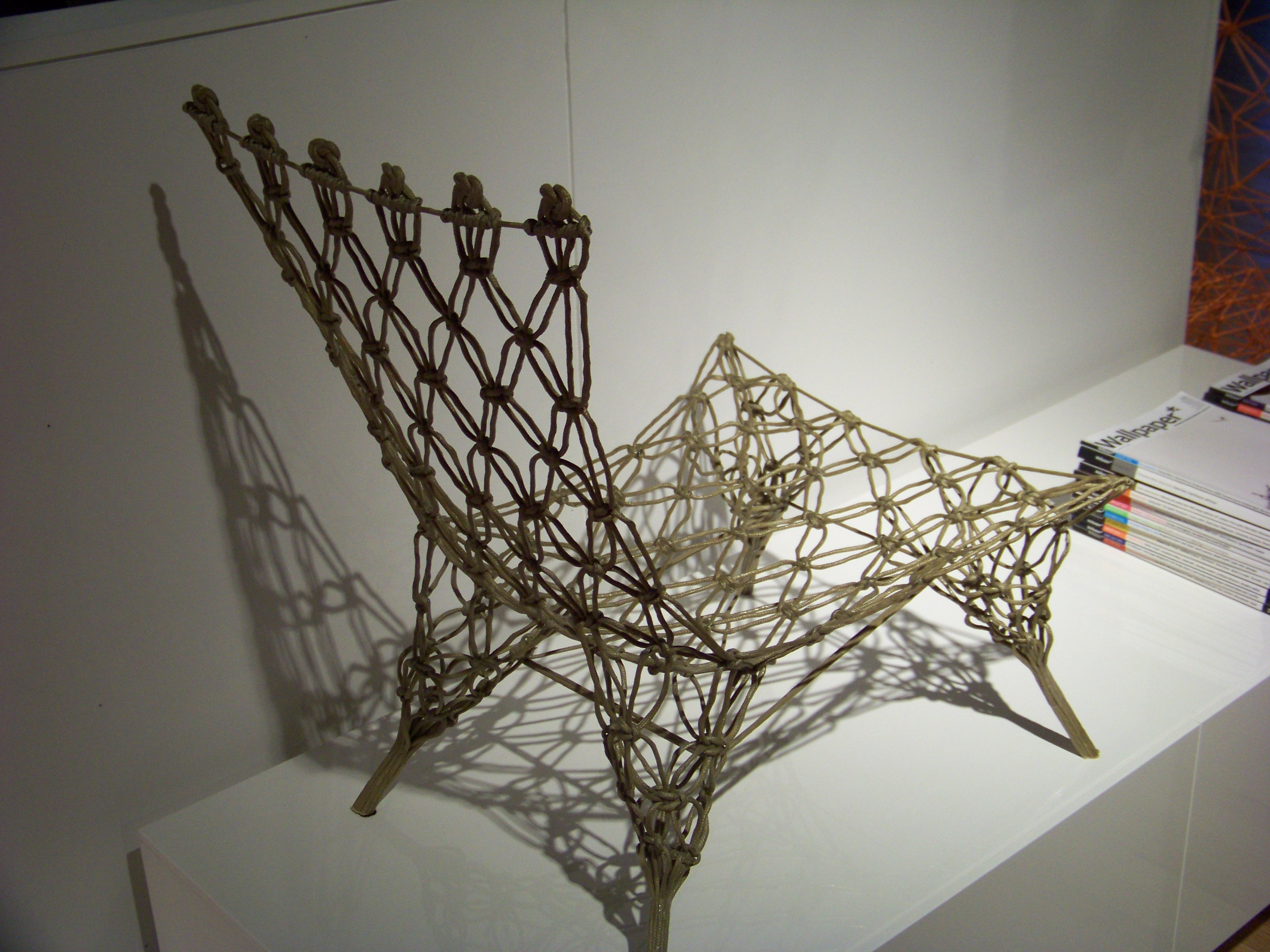
Marcel Wanders: Knotted Chair (1995)

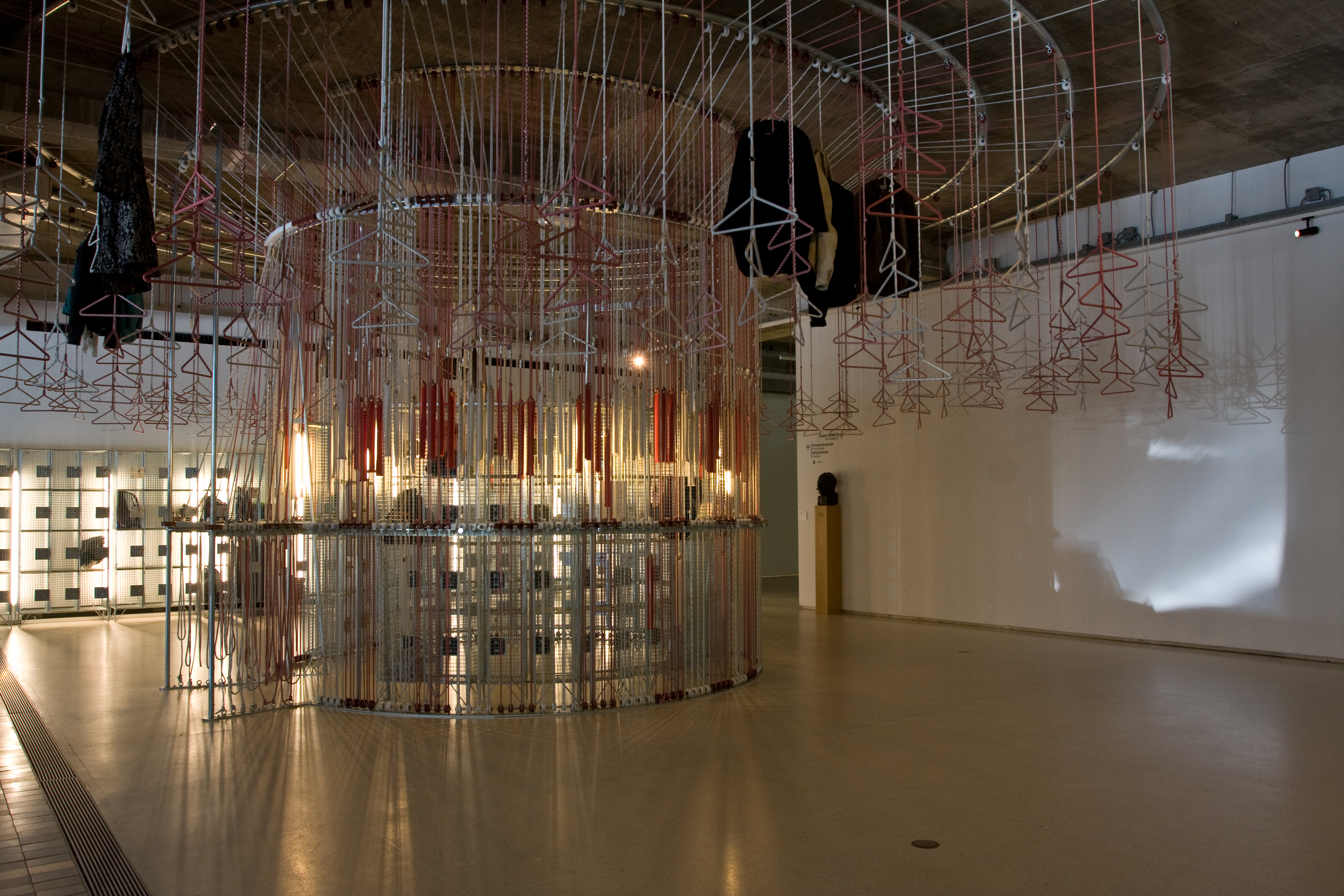
Wieki Somers: Merry-go-round Coat Rack (2009)

Dutch Design is a term used to denote an informal artistic school of design in the Netherlands, particularly product design. More specifically, the term refers to the design esthetic common to designers in the Netherlands.

== History ==
The Netherlands were primarily known for graphic design until the 1980s, when the term Dutch Design started to come into popular use.

The term came to be closely identified with a group of Dutch product designers who have gained international recognition particularly from the 1990s onwards. These include Maarten Baas, Jurgen Bey, Richard Hutten, Hella Jongerius, Wieki Somers, Hester van Eeghen and Marcel Wanders, as well as internationally recognized design firms and collectives like Droog and Moooi which helped gain prominence for Dutch designers at major design events such as the Salone del Mobile in Milan.

More broadly, the term could be extended to fashion designers such as Viktor & Rolf and architects such as Rem Koolhaas and Francine Houben.

The emergence of an internationally recognized Dutch design scene has been fueled by a strong educational system for designers. The Design Academy Eindhoven has produced many well-known designers. In a 2003 article in The New York Times, Murray Moss, the owner of Moss, a design store in Manhattan, called it "without question, currently the best design academy in the world." Another well-known school is Gerrit Rietveld Academie in Amsterdam.

A second contributing factor to the success of Dutch design is government support for new designers. Financial support from the Fonds BKVB (the Fund for Visual Arts, Design and Architecture), launched in 1988, has enabled design students to set themselves up as independent entrepreneurs right after graduation.

Also playing an important role is the fact that design has become an integral part of product development in the Netherlands. Designers are included in the earliest phases of innovative processes and the production development cycle. The Dutch electronics company Philips, for instance, has around 450 people working on design at 12 offices around the world.

The Dutch Design Awards are awarded annually during Dutch Design Week in Eindhoven.

== Reception ==
Dutch Design has been characterized as minimalist, experimental, innovative, quirky, and humorous.

"Dutch design is simple and powerful", according to Hugo van den Bos, strategy director of Dutch graphic design studio Koeweiden Postma. Author and journalist Tracy Metz notes that, "The Dutch have the ability to make fun of themselves. Also it's a matter of combining things that usually don't combine at all. Dutch designers are good in using materials that look worthless. The designers give them a new value."

== Events ==
=== Annual events ===
Logo of the Dutch Design Week (2007)

- Dutch Design Week (Eindhoven), including the Dutch Design Awards

=== Past events ===
- Dutch Design Double (Amsterdam/Utrecht, 2009)
- Dutch Design Expo @ Shanghai International Creative Industry Week (Shanghai, 2008)
- Dutch Design Days (Belgium, 2008)
- Orange Alert (New York City, 2005)
- Via Milano New Dutch Design (Amsterdam),

== See also ==
- Dutch Design Awards
- Dutch Furniture Awards
