= Ahn Sang-soo =

Ahn Sang-soo may refer to:

- Ahn Sang-soo (Changwon mayor) (born 1946), former chairman of the Grand National Party
- Ahn Sang-soo (Incheon mayor) (born 1946), former mayor of Incheon and 2012 presidential candidate
- Ahn Sang-soo (designer) (born 1952), South-Korean typographic designer
