= Piet Zwart =

Dutch architect and industrial designer (1885–1977)

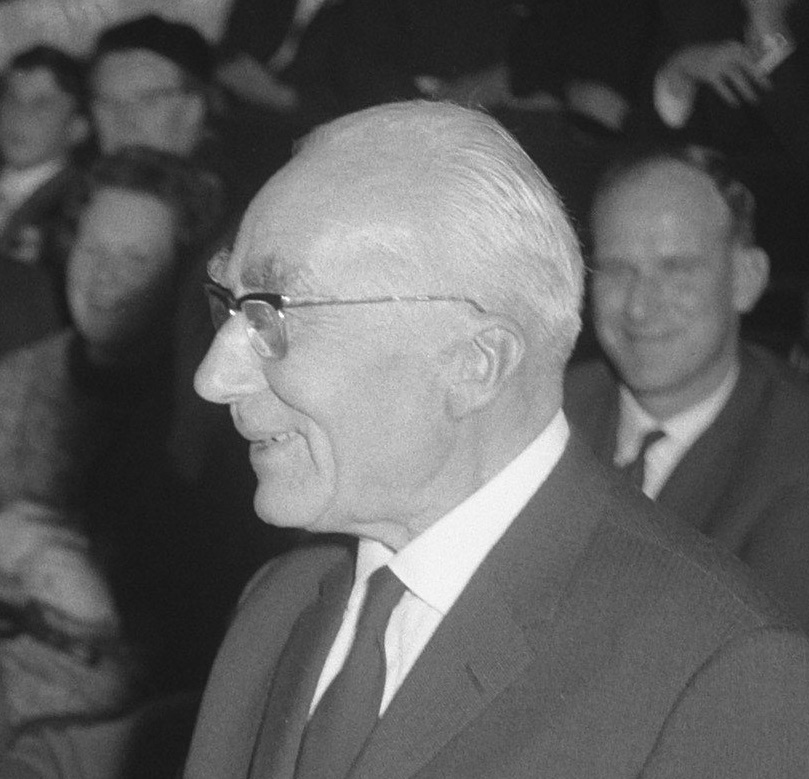
- Zwart in 1964
- Born: 28 May 1885; Zaandijk, Netherlands
- Died: 24 September 1977 (aged 92); Wassenaar, Netherlands
- Education: Architect, photographer
- Known for: Typographer, graphic designer, photographer, industrial designer
- Notable work: NKF Catalog, Book of PTT
- Awards: Designer of the 20th Century by Association of Dutch Designers

Piet Zwart (Dutch pronunciation: [pit ˈsʋɑrt]; (Note: In isolation, Zwart is pronounced [ˈzʋɑrt].) 28 May 1885 – 24 September 1977) was a Dutch photographer, typographer, and industrial designer.

== Biography ==
=== Early life ===
Piet Zwart was born on May 28, 1885, in Zaandijk. He trained as an architect, and began graphic design projects at age 36. His training as an architect included designing furniture and interiors. He was influenced by the De Stijl movement, which focused on the essentials of form, colour and line, but later moved to a more functional design aesthetic. In the early 1920s Zwart received his first typographic commissions from Laga, a flooring manufacturer. Zwart had no formal training in typography or printing, so he was uninhibited by the rules and methods of traditional professional practices. Zwart regarded typography as an important cultural force of the 20th century.

=== Education ===
Zwart attended the Rijksschool voor Kunstnijverheid Amsterdam (National School of Applied Arts, Amsterdam), which later merged into the Amsterdamse Hogeschool voor de Kunsten (Amsterdam University of the Arts), from 1902 to 1907. He studied a diverse range of art related subjects including painting and architecture, and he was introduced to the principles of the English Arts and Crafts movement.

From 1908 he taught drawing and art history lessons at the Industrie- en Huishoudschool voor Meisjes, (Industrial and Domestic School for Girls) in Leeuwarden. In 1913 he moved to Voorburg and returned to study, attending the Technische Universiteit Delft (Delft University of Technology) from 1913 to 1914.

=== Later life ===
From 1919, while continuing to work as an independent designer, he began teaching at the Rotterdam Academy of Visual Arts, now the Willem de Kooning Academy. He was dismissed in 1933 because of what were considered his radical ideas on education. Zwart's ideas were similar to those of the Bauhaus art school in Germany, where, in 1929, he gave a series of guest lectures. Zwart was a member of Nederlandsche Vereeniging voor Ambachts- en Nijverheidskunst (V.A.N.K.) the Dutch Association for Craft and Craft Art.

In 1930, Piet Zwart was asked to design "The Book of PTT." The book was aimed at teaching school children how to use the Dutch postal service. Zwart looked at this as a way to "tickle their curiosity and encourage self reliance." The book was full of bright colors and it was meant to be exciting. He created two main characters for the book: 'The Post' and 'J Self'. They were paper doll cut-outs that he photographed and then touched up with chalk, ink, and color pencil. Additionally, he used many different fonts of varying sizes and thicknesses. He was assisted in illustrating the book by Dick Elffers. The book was finally published in 1938.

In 1942, during World War II, Zwart's design career came to a halt when he was arrested by the occupying German forces. He was held prisoner, along with 800 other prominent people, in an internment camp. He was released in 1945 when the war ended. He resumed his career, mainly focusing on industrial design from this point onward.

Piet Zwart died in 1977, aged 92. The Piet Zwart Institute of the Willem de Kooning Academy in Rotterdam is named after him.

== Design Style ==
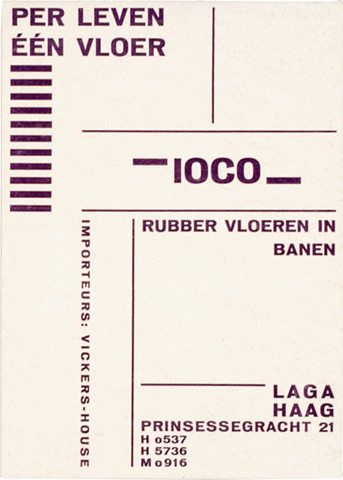
Piet Zwart, advertising card for the Laga Company, 1922

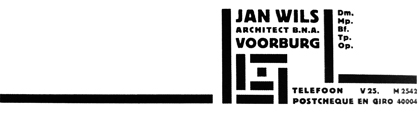
letterhead for Jan Wils, 1921

"Zwart was able to manipulate the oblique perspective in such a way that space was not only activated but made to seem irrational in order to heighten the viewer's experience of what would otherwise have been an ordinary rectangular room."

As a designer, and pioneer of modern typography, Zwart was well known for his work for both Nederlandse Kabelfabriek Delft (a cable factory in Delft) and the Dutch postal, telegraph and telephone service. He did not adhere to traditional typography rules, but used the basic principles of constructivism and "De Stijl" in his commercial work. His work can be recognized by its primary colours, geometrical shapes, repeated word patterns and an early use of photomontage. The latter is exemplified by his well-known cover designs for the series Monografieën over filmkunst (Monographs on Film Art).

His commercial print work has influences from Constructivism, Dada and De Stijl, while still adding a playfulness to the mix. In the 1920s, he began to work for Nederlandsche Kabelfabriek (Cable manufacturers) in Delft. While working for the company, he experimented with upper and lower case letters, lines, circles and screens, and free letter composition. He produced 275 designs within a decade, and then after he moved on to interior design, industrial design and furniture design. Zwart called himself a 'typotect'; part typographer, part architect.

== Working career ==
Piet Zwart is mostly known for his graphic design work. He started his career as an architect and draftsman and worked for Jan Wils and Berlage in 1919. Two years after working for Jans Wils, he worked with Dutch Architect Berlage for several years.

=== Flooring Company ===
In 1920, he got an assignment from the flooring company Vickers House. He made several advertisements for this client. "Zagen, boren, vijlen" (saws, drills and files) Zwart solved a practical print problem by assembling letters, blanks, and symbols from print houses.

=== NKF Catalog ===
In 1923 Berlage introduced him to one of his relatives. the manager of the Nederlandsche Kabelfabriek (NKF) at Delft. He had experimented with typography in the early 1920s, but, while working at the NKF, he realised how unaware he was of the terms and methods of printing. He didn't know the difference between lower and uppercase letters. An 18-year-old assistant at the NKF helped him learn the principles of printing. He created a total of 275 designs in 10 years for the NKF Company, almost all typographical works. He experimented with small and large letters, circles and rectangles, visual puns, repetition and alliteration. He resigned in 1933 to become an interior, industrial and furniture designer.

=== Photography ===
Zwart began using photographic images in his compositions in 1926. He first worked with commercial photographers. Thus creating a balance between two-dimensional type and the three-dimensional image. The photographs that he integrated into his work have high contrast, negative images, and are overprinted with colored inks and cropped into geometric shapes. In 1928, he bought his own camera and taught himself the photographic techniques. Zwarts admiration for repetition, structure, lines and planes, and balance show throughout his photographs. Zwart experimented with photography while working for the NKF catalog. He photographed the close-ups of the electric cables.

=== Stamps 1931 ===
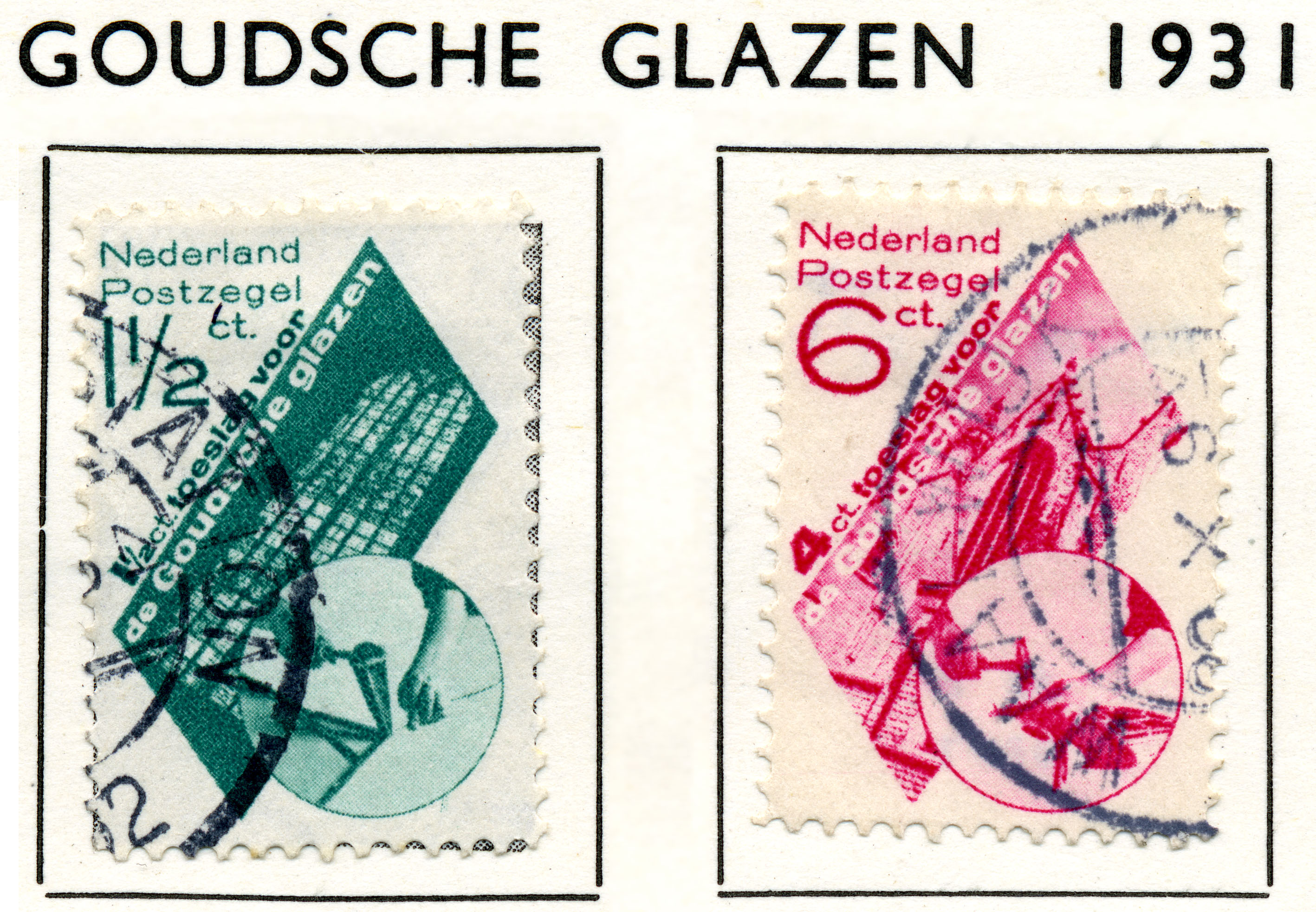
Stamps 1931
Stained glass Gouda

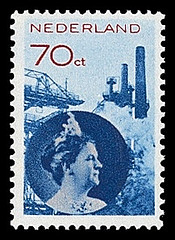
Wilhelmina stamp

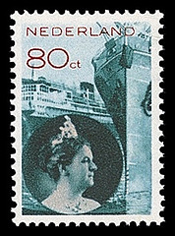
Wilhelmina stamp

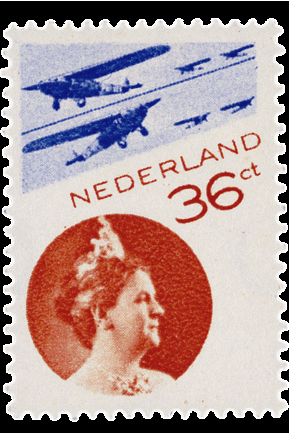
Design Wilhelmina stamp (1931)

=== Ring Neuer Werbegestalter ===
Zwart was a member of the Ring neuer Werbegestalter which is an avant-garde group of advertisement designers.

=== Zwart's Industrial Design ===
In the Netherlands immediately before World War II, activity in the design field grew rapidly, calling for new solutions to functional problems. In 1938 Zwart's prefabricated kitchen consisting of independent units was brought out on the Dutch market, revolutionising kitchen interiors which also illustrated the creativity of mass-production of useful objects.

In 1930, Zwart was employed by the Bruynzeel Company. First he designed their annual calendars and other commercial items. He helped with other areas of the company, too. He was the first to design a kitchen for mass production. Zwart is best known for his design of the Bruynzeel modular kitchen in 1937, which is still available today. The design reflects graphic organization and it is considered mass-production. The design was highly-progressive for its time. Zwart's Bruynzeel Modular Kitchen was exhibited in Germany-Netherlands: Interactions 1920–1940 at the Haags Gemeentemuseum. This was an example of a 'rational kitchen.'

== Awards ==
In 2000, Zwart was awarded the "Designer of the Century" award by the Association of Dutch Designers.

The BNO Piet Zwart Award (since 1983), conferred by the Association of Dutch Designers, is named after Piet Zwart.

== Sources ==
- Meggs, Philip B., Purvis, Alston W.History of Graphic Design. Hoboken, N.J: Wiley, 2006
- De Jesus, Sherman (2012). Everything Must Change – Piet Zwart. Memphis Film & Television. Original title: Alles Moet Nieuw – Piet Zwart.
- Industrial Design in the Netherlands, Pieter Brattinga, Design Quarterly, No. 59, Industrial Design in the Netherlands (1964), pp. 1–25
- Video describes Piet Simply on YouTube
- Sillevis, John, The Hague. Germany-Netherlands: Interactions 1920–1940, The Burlington Magazine, Vol. 124, No. 951 (Jun., 1982), pp. 385–386+388

Published by: The Burlington Magazine Publications, Ltd.

- The Omega Workshops by Judith Collins; The De Stijl Environment by Nancy Troy, Review by: Gillian Naylor, Design Issues, Vol. 2, No. 2 (Autumn, 1985), pp. 85–88, Published by: The MIT Press
- Piet Zwart (1885–1977). Form Engineer, Gemeente Museum, Den Haag.
- Yvonne Brentjens, Piet Zwart vormingenieur, Waanders Uitgevers Zwolle (2008)
- Piet Zwart, Piet Zwart, Focus Pub (1997)
- Fridolin Muller, Piet Zwart, Hastings House Publishers: New York, 1966
- Iconofgraphics
- Design History
- Piet Zwart Institute Willem de Kooning Academy Rotterdam University
- Tudor, Sebastian, Visual Involved, November 24, 2010.
- Design Is History
- The Design Observer Group, June 24, 200
- The book of PTT on YouTube
- Modernism 101
