= Jan van Toorn =

Dutch graphic designer (1932–2020)

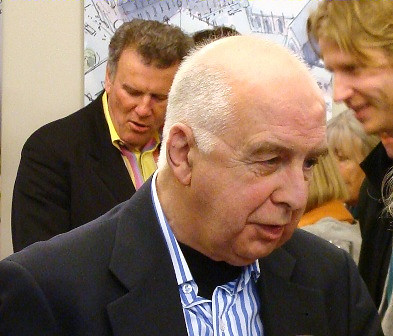
- Born: 9 May 1932; Tiel
- Died: 13 November 2020 (aged 88); Amsterdam
- Alma mater: Gerrit Rietveld Academie
- Occupation: Graphic designer, photographer, typographer, postage stamp designer, poster artist, exhibition designer, book designer, painter, art curator, graphic artist
- Employer: Mart. Spruijt; Museumjournaal; PTT; Sikkens; Gerrit Rietveld Academie (1968–1985); Jan van Eyck Academie (1991–1998); Jumbo Games; Rhode Island School of Design; Rijksakademie van beeldende kunsten (1987–1989); Stedelijk Museum Breda; Van Abbemuseum; Wereldmuseum Amsterdam
- Relatives: Willem van Toorn
- Awards: H.N. Werkman Award (1965); H.N. Werkman Award (1972); Piet Zwart Award (1985)

Jan van Toorn (9 May 1932 – 13 November 2020) was a Dutch graphic designer.

== Biography ==
Van Toorn began working in a printing house in Amsterdam as a teenager. He also attended evening classes at a graphic school and the Gerrit Rietveld Academie. He became a freelance graphic designer in 1957, making calendars for Mart.Spruijt in Amsterdam and posters and catalogs for the Van Abbemuseum in Eindhoven.

In the 1980s, van Toorn became active in the field of education, teaching at the Gerrit Rietveld Academie and the Jan Van Eyck Academie in Maastricht. He received the Piet Zwart Prijs in 1985. In February 2008, he sent his collective works to the archives at the University of Amsterdam.

Jan van Toorn died in Amsterdam on 13 November 2020 at the age of 88.
