= Association of Dutch Designers =

- Established: 1996 (30 years ago)
- Country: Netherlands
- Chairpersons: Timo de Rijk
- Website: www.bno.nl

The Association of Dutch Designers (Dutch: Beroepsorganisatie Nederlandse Ontwerpers, abbreviated as BNO) is a professional association for designers and design studios in the Netherlands. The organisation supports the professionalisation and promotion of the Dutch design sector. As of 2025, BNO's main office is located at de Baanderij in the NDSM area of Amsterdam.

The BNO offers trainings, mentoring, business and legal advice, and internal networking events to its members, to support designers and design studios in their work and career.

The organization has been known as Beroepsorganisatie Nederlandse Ontwerpers since 1996 and has many predecessors from various design disciplines, including graphic design, industrial and product design. Its earliest predecessor is the Vereniging voor Ambachts- en Nijverheidskunst, founded in 1904. The BNO was a co-initiator of the Dutch Design Awards in 2003, and it awards the BNO Piet Zwart Prize.

The Netherlands Institute for Art History holds the archives of BNO and a number of its predecessors.
