= Gutenberg Prize of the City of Leipzig =

Award

The Gutenberg Prize of the City of Leipzig (German: Gutenberg-Preis der Stadt Leipzig) is an award in memory of Johannes Gutenberg. Since 1959, the prize honor personalities or institutions that make outstanding contributions to the promotion of the art of books. Awarded people and Institutions have set standards with their artistic, technical, or scientific achievements, especially in the areas of typography, book illustration, book publishing, and book production.

The award is in the Leipzig tradition as a historic center for print quality and care for book art.

Since 1993, the Gutenberg Prize has been alternated with the Gutenberg Prize of the City of Mainz and the Gutenberg International Society annually. The prize is endowed with 10,000 euros.

== Winners ==
- 1959: Horst Erich Wolter
- 1960: Karl Gossow; Offizin Andersen Nexö Leipzig
- 1961: Albert Kapr; Erfurt printing company
- 1962: Werner Klemke; Typoart Dresden / Leipzig
- 1963: Solomon Benediktinowitsch Telingater, Fritz Helmuth Ehmcke
- 1964: University of Graphics and Book Art of Leipzig
- 1965: Lajos Lengyel, Jan Tschichold; Large-scale graphic company Völkerfreundschaft Dresden
- 1966: Hans Baltzer, Bruno Rebner
- 1967: publishing house Philipp Reclam jun. Leipzig
- 1968: Walter Schiller, Vasil Jontschev; Interdruck Leipzig
- 1969: Bruno Kaiser; Röderdruck Leipzig
- 1970: German Museum of Books and Writing Leipzig; Graphic arts institution H.F. Jütte Leipzig
- 1971: Andrei Dmitrijewitsch Gontscharow
- 1972: Horst Kunze, Roman Tomaszewski
- 1973: Hellmuth Tschörtner
- 1974: Insel publishing house "Anton Kippenberg" Leipzig, publishing house of the art Dresden
- 1975: Vadim Vladimirovich Lazursky; Stock Exchange Association of German Booksellers in Leipzig
- 1976: Joachim Kölbel
- 1977: Horst Schuster, György Haiman, Siegfried Hempel, Hans Marquardt
- 1978: HAP Grieshaber
- 1979: Gert Wunderlich
- 1980: Edition Leipzig
- 1981: Hans Fronius
- 1982: Tibor Szántó, Helmut Selle
- 1983: Siegfried Hoffmann
- 1984: Elizabeth Shaw
- 1985: Dmitri Spiridonowitsch Bisti
- 1986: Jiri Salamoun
- 1987: Fritz Helmut Landshoff
- 1988: Lothar Reher
- 1989: Yü Bing-Nan, Klaus Ensikat
- 1990: Heinz Hellmis
- 1991: Oldrich Hlavsa
- 1992: Gutenberg Book Guild; Jürgen Seuss, Hans Peter Willberg
- 1993: Kurt Löb
- 1995: Wilhelm Neufeld
- 1997: Květa Pacovská
- 1999: Jost Hochuli
- 2001: Irma Boom
- 2003: Wolf Erlbruch
- 2005: Alvaro Sotillo
- 2007: Ahn Sang-soo
- 2009: Uwe Loesch
- 2011: Karl-Georg Hirsch
- 2013: Friedrich Pfäfflin
- 2015: Jan Philipp Reemtsma
- 2017: Klaus Detjen
- 2019: Fonts for Freedom
