= Jost Hochuli =

Swiss graphic designer (1933–2026)

Jost Hochuli (8 June 1933 – 18 October 2026) was a Swiss graphic designer known for his book designs. He was also the author of Detail in Typography, which has been translated into several languages.

== Early career ==
Jost Hochuli attended the school of arts and crafts in St. Gallen from 1952 to 1954 and then worked from 1954 to 1955 as an apprentice with Rudolf Hostettler at the Zollikofer & Co. AG printing house, St. Gallen. He completed an apprenticeship as a typographer from 1955 to 1958 partly at the Zollikofer press and partly in typesetting class at the Zurich School of Applied Arts, where he also attended typesetting courses with Walter Käch.

In 1958–1959, during a stay in Paris, he attended courses with Adrian Frutiger at the École Estienne.

== Career ==
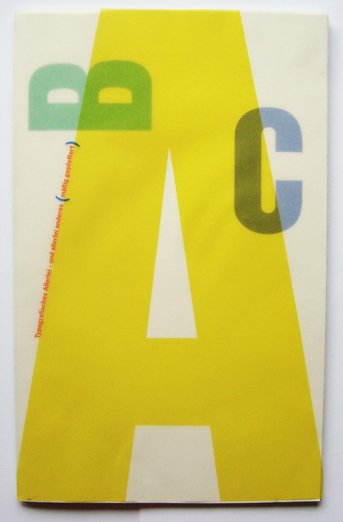
Typografisches Allerlei (1997)

Jost Hochuli opened his commercial graphics workshop in 1959, focused on industrial and institutional graphics.

In 1979, Jost Hochuli was one of the co-founders of the VGS Publishing Association (today Publishing Association) St. Gallen. The small publisher publishes mainly, but not exclusively, local and regional articles. From its foundation until 2004, Jost Hochuli was president of the publishing house, and until 2011 he was also responsible for the design of the books. As editor and designer, Jost Hochuli has worked in the Edition Typotron series (1983–1998) and Edition Ostschweiz (since 2000).

As an author, he has published books and various articles on typography and book design. His book The Detail in Typography has been translated into eleven languages in recent years and is widely used by experts. Other renowned specialist publications are his book Make Books or Overview of Book Design in Switzerland.

From 1967 to 1980, as a successor to Walter Käch, he was a part-time type teacher at the Zurich School of Applied Arts, later also for formal basic training for graphic designers, interrupted by a six-month study visit to England in 1968. From 1980 to 1996, Hochuli was a part-time type teacher at the St. Gallen School of Design, as well as director of the extra-occupational training course 'Type Designer'.

Hochuli later worked as a designer, supervising book projects, organising and curating exhibitions on the subject of book design, and offering lectures, seminars and workshops at home and abroad. In 2010 he founded the typeface company ABC Litera with typographers Roland Stieger and Jonas Niedermann, who also sells his first typeface, Allegra. He established the type foundry ABC Litera in 2014 with Roland Stieger and Jonas Niedermann. Hochuli designed the typeface Allegra.

== Death ==
Hochuli died on 18 October 2026, at the age of 93.

== Awards ==
Hochuli received the Icograda Honorary Award at the International Book Art Exhibition in Leipzig (1989); the Gutenberg Prize of the City of Leipzig (1999); Jan Tschichold Prize (2004). He was an Honorary Member of the Double Crown Club in London and Senator of the International Gutenberg Society in Mainz.

== Publications ==
- Detail in typography (1987)
- Book design in Switzerland (1993)
- Designing books: practice and theory (1996)
- Jost Hochuli: Printed matter, mainly books (2002)
