= Dutch Design Awards =

Dutch award for designers

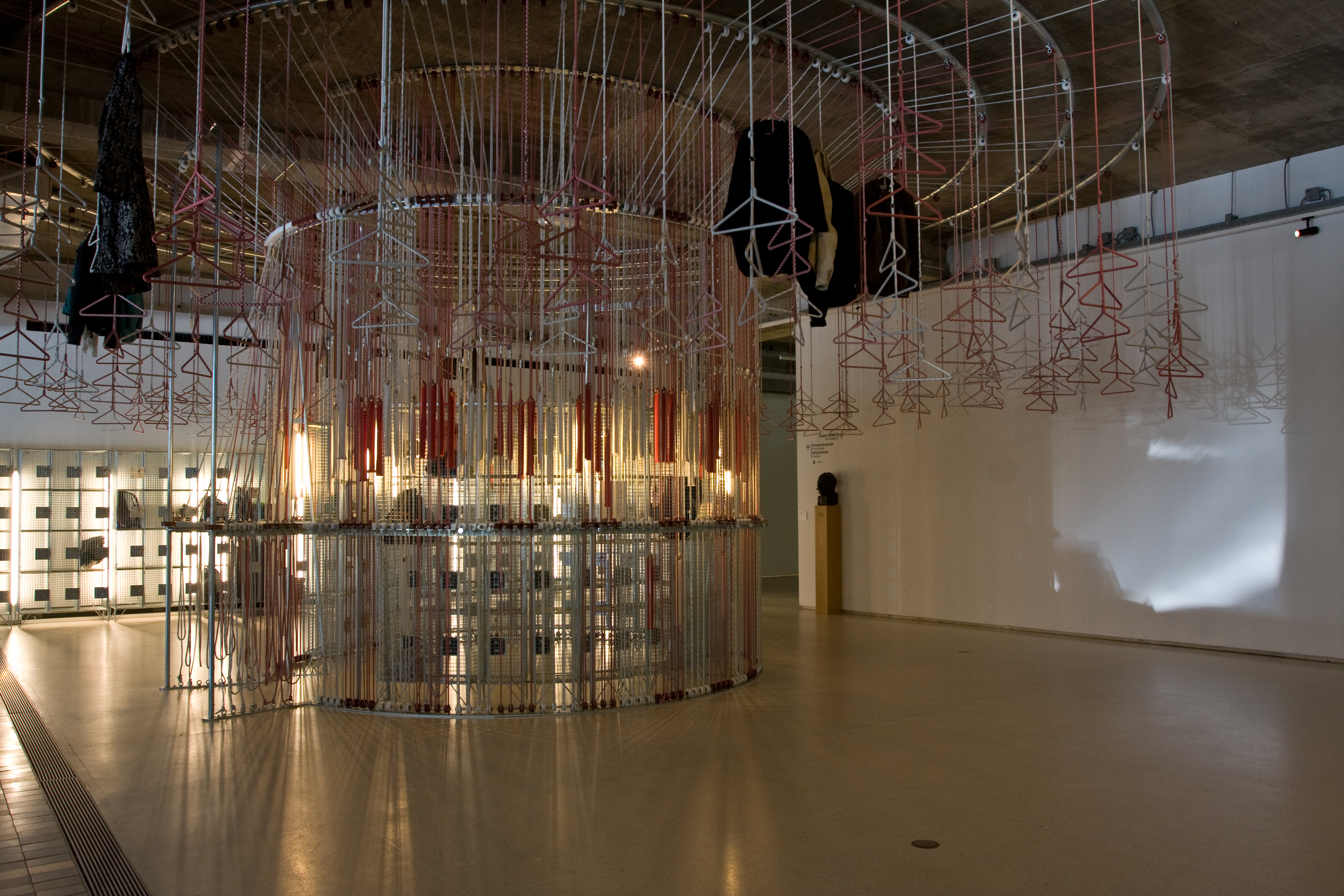
Studio Wieki Somers won the Golden Eye in 2009 with the Merry-go-round Coat Rack, designed for the cloakroom of Museum Boijmans Van Beuningen

The Dutch Design Awards (DDA) honour the best Dutch designs across eight categories. Design initiatives and designers in the Netherlands are awarded annually, primarily by relevance and impact, but also to the extent to which they relate to their own field.

The awards are handed out during the annual Dutch Design Week in the Dutch city of Eindhoven. A year book and exhibition of the nominated designs are also presented as part of the event. Dutch Design Awards are organised by the Dutch Design Foundation and the city of Eindhoven.

== Overview ==
Dutch Design Awards have been handed out since 2003. In 2008, the name was changed from the Dutch-language Nederlandse Design Prijzen to the current name.

Twenty prizes are handed out during an annual awards show. In addition to the main prize, the Golden Eye, which honours the most successful Dutch designer or design studio, awards are handed out in a number of categories. Each category has its own selection committee, and the winners are selected by an international jury. One exception is the public award, the Audi Design Award; the winner of this prize is chosen from a shortlist by means of a public election held on the Web site of the Dutch Design Awards and in the Bijenkorf department store in Eindhoven.

In 2009, the awards were presented on October 17 at Muziekcentrum Frits Philips in Eindhoven. The main prize, the Golden Eye, went to Studio Wieki Somers (Wieki Somers and Dylan van den Berg) for their Merry-go-round Coat Rack, a carousel-like construction to hang coats, designed for the cloakroom of Museum Boijmans Van Beuningen. During the awards ceremony, the first edition of the Dutch Design Jaarboek was presented to Eindhoven mayor Rob van Gijzel. The nominated designs were exhibited from October 17 to 25 at the Brainport Greenhouse, a large glass greenhouse on Stadhuisplein square in Eindhoven.

== Categories ==
- Data & Interaction
- Communication
- Design Research
- Fashion
- Habitat
- Product
- Best Commissioning
- Young Designer
- Other awards:
  - Public Award
  - BNO Piet Zwart Prijs

== See also ==
- Dutch Design Week
- Dutch Design
- Dutch Furniture Awards
- Rotterdam Design Award
- Piet Zwart Award
