= Joost van Bleiswijk =

Dutch designer

Joost van Bleiswijk (born 1976, Delft) is a Dutch designer who lives in Eindhoven. After he graduated at the Design Academy he became known for his Outlines series.

== Education ==
Joost van Bleiswijk is a prolific Dutch designer who gives great value to the process of making. He grew up in Delft, and studied at the Design Academy of Eindhoven, where he met his future partner, Kiki van Eijk.

Stanislas college Delft VWO Diploma obtained in 1996

Design Academy Eindhoven Juni 2001 Man and Well-Being.

== Work ==
Next to his own collections he worked with several companies such as Ahrend, Bernhardt Design, Bruut furniture, city of Eindhoven, design connection Brainport, Lebesque, etc. His work is sold and exhibited through (inter)national galleries as for example Moss gallery in New York City and Vivid gallery in Rotterdam, Secondome, the Holon Design Museum in Israel and the Zuiderzeemuseum in the Netherlands.

Curved and taped 2019 Interlocking panels 2019 Fusion 2019 Brass Sculpture Private Collector 2019 Sketched 2018 Tinkering Lamps 2017 Mechanic constructions 2016 The Protopunk 2016 The Protopunk-1 2015 Collage 2014 2014 Framed Frames 2014 Prop lamps 2014 NSNG rough shiny collection 2014 Scratch Set 2012 Collage 2012 Heavy Metal 2013 Heavy Metal 2011 One more time clocks 2011 No screw no glue rough collection 2010 The Poor Man’s Gold for the Zuiderzee Museum 2010 Rivet Lamps 2010 Candle lines candleholders 2010 No screw no glue Corroded serie 2009 Pendulum XL 2009 Compose collection 2008 No screw no glue collection f.e. Wallcabinet, candelabrum et. 2008 No screw no glue collection f.e. chessboard, little clock and cabinet xl2007 No screw, no glue stainless steel collection 2006 No screw no glue in trespa 2006 Game Table 2006 Single Cut Vases 2005 Construct collection 2005 Outlines 2005

He has also turned his attentions to the world of textiles, designing the patterns of luxury carpets.

== Other activities ==
Lecture at Wanted Design Week Kyiv, 2009 - Lecture at Witte dame Eindhoven 2007- Guest teacher at Krabbesholm design school - Lecture at the U.N. University Tokio 2006 - Concept belleza Universale 2005 - Concept Design-Sucks 2003/2004 - Concept scrapheap-design-challenge 2004 - Design workshops Art-quake Hoofddorp 2002/2003
