= Karel Martens =

Dutch graphic designer

Karel Martens (born 1939) is a Dutch freelance graphic designer and educator known for his experimental work in typography, book and poster design. Considered one of the most influential Dutch designers working today, Martens is a co-founder of Werkplaats Typografie, a postgraduate course in graphic design at the Arnhem College of Art in Arnhem, Netherlands.

== Biography ==
Martens was born in Mook en Middelaar in 1939 and graduated from the Arnhem Academy of Art and Industrial Arts of the Netherlands in 1961 where he studied fine arts. He did not study graphic design because it was not considered a career at the time and therefore, did not exist as its own course of study. In school he took many classes such as painting, sculpture making, illustration, and publicity. Today he is recognized as one of the most influential practitioners in graphic design.

He started teaching at ArtEZ in Arnhem in 1977. In 1998 he, along with Wigger Bierma, founded the Werkplaats Typografie, a renowned Masters course for typography in Arnhem, Netherlands. Martens’s practice consists of designing and teaching. He is responsible for the design of architectural magazine OASE, in collaboration with current and former students. And he has designed books for publisher SUN in many varying formats. His work has also included designing coins, postage stamps and telephone cards for the Dutch government.

In 1996 he was awarded the Dr A.H. Heineken Prize for Art, in 2012 he won the Gerrit Noordzij Prize, and in 2023 the BNO Piet Zwart Award. He also received an honourable mention for the Rotterdam Design Prize in 1995.

His book Printed Matter, published in 1996 with Jaap van Triest, was named The Best Designed Book in the World at the 1998 Leipzig Book Fair. His books, letterpress prints, and monoprints have been described as highly collectible.

He is included in a list of “one hundred of history's leading practitioners” in the book The Designer Says, along with other notable practitioners of graphic design.

== Methods ==
Many of Martens’ work ranges from posters, to prints and to editorials, but all have a strong emphasis on typography. He had always been fascinated with language, mathematics and color and he finds a way to incorporate all these interests into his designs.

His work is not glamorous. In fact, his monoprints series was created using found metal objects taken from discarded car parts, disks, and other miscellaneous objects collected from the side of the road. He uses these objects to print ink on found paper. His methods are slow but very precise—he prints one colour per day, waits for it to dry, and prints the second colour the next day. By this method, Martens’ prints may take days or weeks to be completed.

One of Martens’ longest on-going projects is his Stedelijk print collection. It began when the catalogues in the Stedelijk Museum in Amsterdam were being digitized and the old archive cards—designed by Willem Sandberg—were being discarded. Martens proceeded to take the documents and have been using them as a canvas for his projects since and each print is unique in that they are made from individual catalogue cards. These finalized prints are now used as diplomas, which will be presented to the Werkplaats students upon graduation.

== Werkplaats Typografie ==
The Werkplaats Typografie (WT) is a two-year graphic design master programme at the ArtEZ University of Arts and was founded by Karel Martens and his former student Wigger Bierma in 1998. The idea to start Werkplaats Typografie came from the problems Martens found in existing models of design education in the Netherlands. He notes that “A little bit what I’m regretting now in design education is that its design, design, design, the students always looking in magazines, looking at how other designers are doing it—it’s incestuous…students often see inspiration in copying things, not in the energy of the work or the mentality behind the design but the flavor of it and the superficial work.” He did not want his programme to be a place that just churned out designers, but one that urges students to own styles and personalities.

The program is very hands-on and offers many collaborative opportunities to work with external clients. Since its conception, the school regularly invites guests to review student work, give presentations, or host workshops. The students are often invited to work with both international and national festivals and projects. In addition to these opportunities, students are expected to work on self-initiated projects as well as attend meetings, lectures, and seminars. The curriculum consists of three components:

1. Presentations, individual and group critiques, workshops;
2. practical assignments and
3. theoretical orientation in the form of research, excursions and a final thesis. Through the programme they will learn how to find the balance their skills between personal expression and practical application and encouraged to approach design theoretically.
