= Natsai Audrey Chieza =

Fashion designer

- Born: Harare, Zimbabwe
- Education: Central Saint Martins; University of Edinburgh
- Occupation: Fashion designer
- Known for: Biomaterials
- Title: Founder, Faber Futures

Natsai Audrey Chieza is a designer and the founder of Faber Futures, a R&D studio that creates biologically inspired materials. She gave a 2017 TED talk on fashion's problem with pollution. She is Designer in Residence at Ginkgo Bioworks.

== Early life and education ==
Chieza was born in Harare, Zimbabwe. She moved to the United Kingdom when she was seventeen years old. She studied Architecture at the University of Edinburgh. She then joined Central Saint Martins, where she completed a Master's in Materials Futures. She worked with University College London's John Ward, a Professor of Synthetic Biology, and became interested in the sustainability of synthetic biology and stem cell research. During this time she was Designer in Residence at the Advanced Centre for Biochemical Engineering, University College London.

== Research and career ==
Chieza joined the Textile Futures Research Centre. She identified that streptomyces could be used as a fabric dye. Streptomyces produce actinorhodin, which changes colour depending on the acidity of its environment. In Project Coelicolor, these bacteria were used to dye silk scarves. She has exhibited at the Victoria and Albert Museum, Science Gallery, Bauhaus Dessau Foundation, Harvard Art Museums and Audax Textile Museum. She was a resident designer at IDEO. She has taught at Central Saint Martins and The Bartlett.

Chieza was concerned about pollution in the fashion industry. Chieza founded Faber Futures, a biomaterial research and development studio in London. She was chosen to give a TED talk in Tanzania on fashion's problem with pollution. She has done two TED talks from then to now. In February 2018 she was named as one of OkayAfrica's Top 100 Women. In 2018 she launched the Ginkgo Bioworks Creative Residency in Boston. She was a participant at the 2018 Sci Foo camp.
