= Moooi =

Dutch interior design company

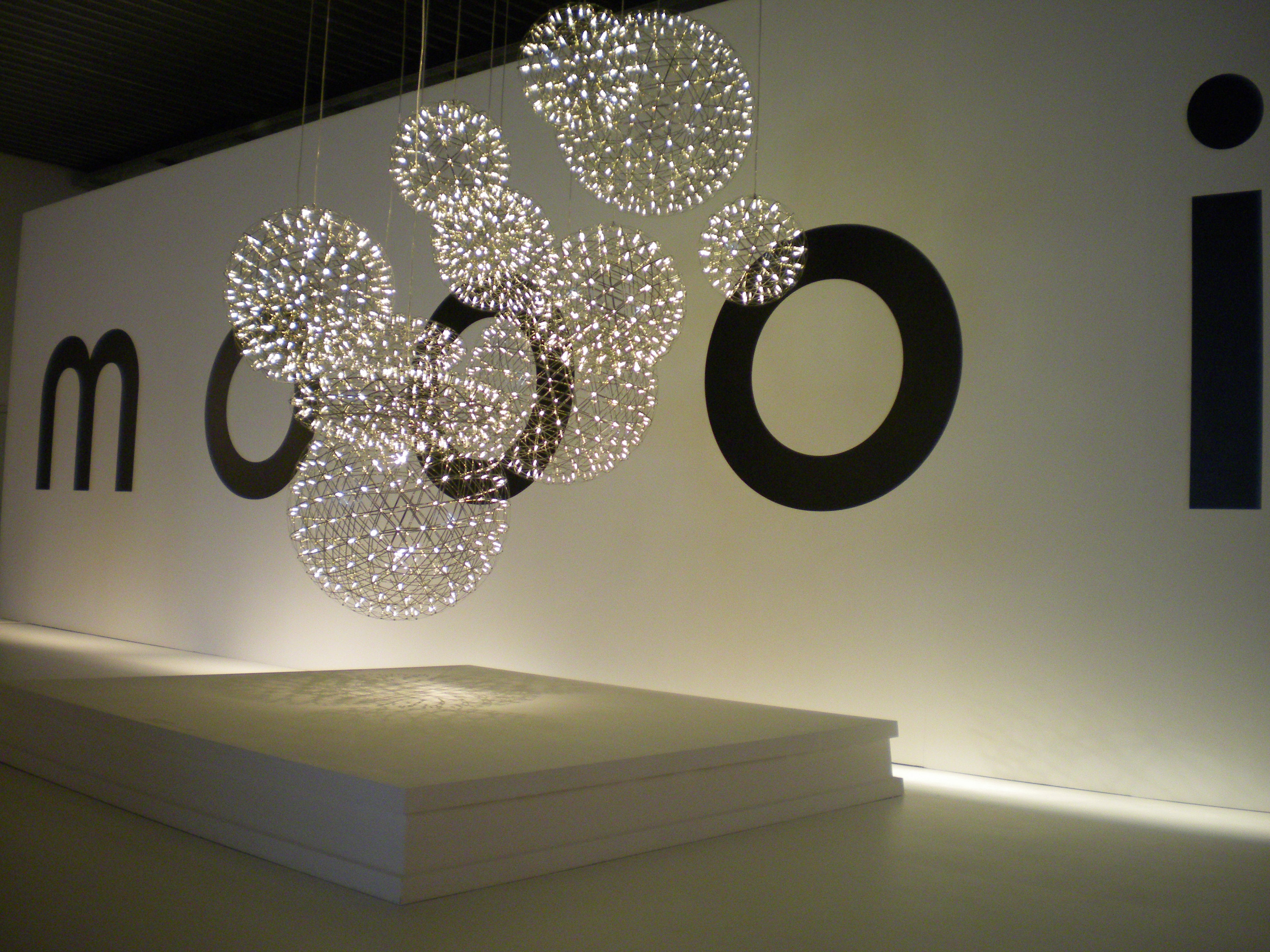
- Industry: Interior Design
- Founded: 2001
- Founders: Marcel Wanders and Casper Vissers
- Headquarters: Breda, the Netherlands
- Number of locations: Breda (Headquarters); Amsterdam, Netherlands (Brand Store & Showroom); New York City, US (Brand Store & Showroom); London, UK (Showroom); Stockholm, Sweden (Showroom)
- Area served: Worldwide
- Products: Furniture; Lighting; Interior design; Carpets; Wallcovering; Home accessories
- Number of employees: 120 (November 2019)

Moooi is a Dutch furniture, interior, and lighting modern design company. It was founded by Marcel Wanders and Casper Vissers in the Netherlands in 2001.

== History and ownership ==
Designer Marcel Wanders first approached Moooi co-founder and former CEO Casper Vissers to help him market a designer lamp shade. Together they founded Moooi in 2001 with the intention of working with unconventional designers. The company's name, "Moooi," is a twist on the Dutch word "mooi," meaning beautiful, with an extra "o" added to differentiate it and because the domain mooi.com was already taken.

Wanders acts as both the Art Director and a designer of Moooi.

Moooi's first international show was the Salone del Mobile in Milan in 2001. In 2002, entrepreneur Hans Lensvelt, owner of the LENSVELT brand of office furniture, became a 33% owner of the company. Prominent Italian design brand B&B Italia acquired a 50% share in the company in 2006, which it held until 2012. That year, founders Wanders and Vissers became the majority owners again after buying back half of the stock owned by B&B Italia and the remaining shares held by Lensvelt (by this time 10%). In 2015, Wanders and Vissers, who previously owned 50% of the company, again became the majority shareholders.

Vissers stepped down as Moooi CEO in 2015, and he and Wanders announced Robin Bevers, the Managing Director of the Marcel Wanders Studio from 2005 to 2010, as his replacement beginning in September of that year.

In April 2025 the company announced that Anders Westerholm will replace Robin Bevers as CEO in September of the same year.

== Products ==
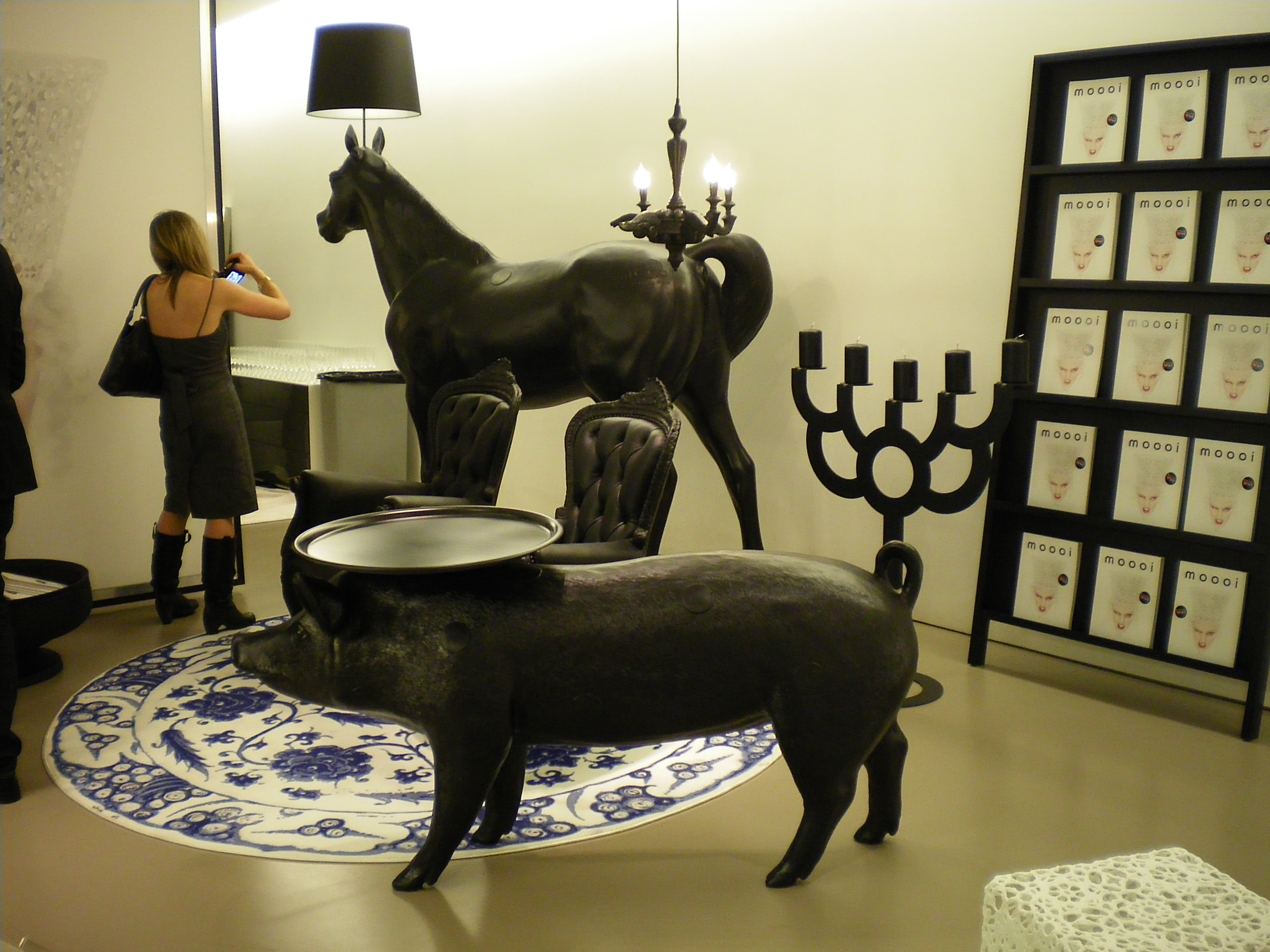
Moooi at B&B Italia New York, 2009

The company carries lighting, furniture, accessories, wallcovering and carpet collections. Moooi designs are available in 82 countries: via (e-commerce) retailers, project- and contract dealers, agents & distributors, their own (brand)stores and their website.

== Locations ==
- The company is headquartered in Breda, Netherlands, and the Moooi warehouse is located in the same region.
- Moooi's 700 m^{2} flagship showroom and brand store, opened in 2008, is located in Amsterdam's Jordaan neighborhood. Until 2013, the showroom and shop was known as the Moooi Gallery and also hosted special exhibitions, such as the 2010 exhibition by Lorenzo Petrantoni. In 2013 the brand decided the space should show only Moooi products.
- In 2010, a showroom was opened in London’s Paddington district.
- Moooi opened a showroom in Milan’s Zona Tortona in 2010. It was closed in 2013.
- A New York City showroom and brand store opened in April 2015 in a 3,875 ft^{2} (360 m^{2}) showroom in the city's NoMad area.
- Moooi products are offered in various design stores in 82 countries.
- In September 2021, Moooi store The Hague opened in the Westfield Mall of The Netherlands.

== Projects and collaborations ==
The company frequently collaborates with photographers such as Erwin Olaf to present collections, beginning with the brand’s first Salone del Mobile in 2001. Collaborations have included “Naked Portraits” (2002-2006), “Super Heroes” (2007-2008), “Luxury Accessories” (2008), “Inside the Box” (2012). For Moooi's new collection presentation in Milan in 2013, Wanders asked Olaf to select photographs from his personal work, a collection of interior design photography. For the 2014 exhibition, the brand collaborated with photographer Massimo Listri. In 2015 it was Rahi Rezvani. Levi van Veleuw's work was installed in the Amsterdam and London showrooms in 2013. Rezvani's work is also currently featured in Moooi's new NYC showroom.
