= Ahn Sang-soo (designer) =

South Korean designer (born 1952)

- Born: Ahn Sang-soo; 1952 (age 73–74); Chungju, South Korea
- Education: Hongik University
- Occupations: Typographer, book designer, translator

Ahn Sang-soo (Korean: 안상수; born 1952) is a South Korean leading typographic designer.

== Biography ==
Ahn was born in Chungju, South Korea.

Ahn Sang-soo developed an interest in Hangul typography in the early 1980s. He invented many typefaces, including one named after himself. He graduated from the university of Hongik.

After graduation, he became an advertising designer for LG Electronics. He joined the Ggumim magazine as an art editor in 1981 and then the magazines Ma-dang and Meot as art director in 1983. In 1985, he created the design firm Ahn Graphics.

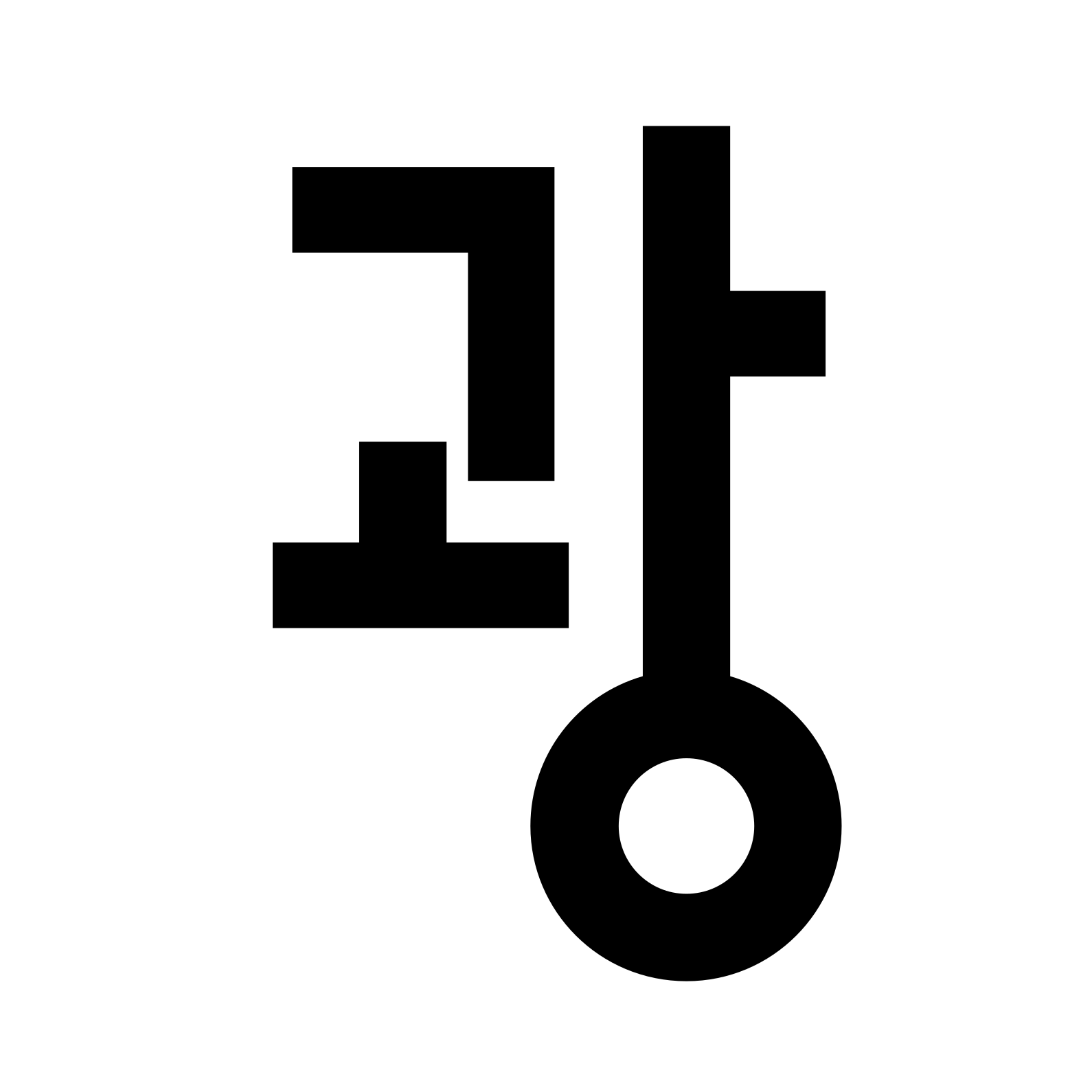
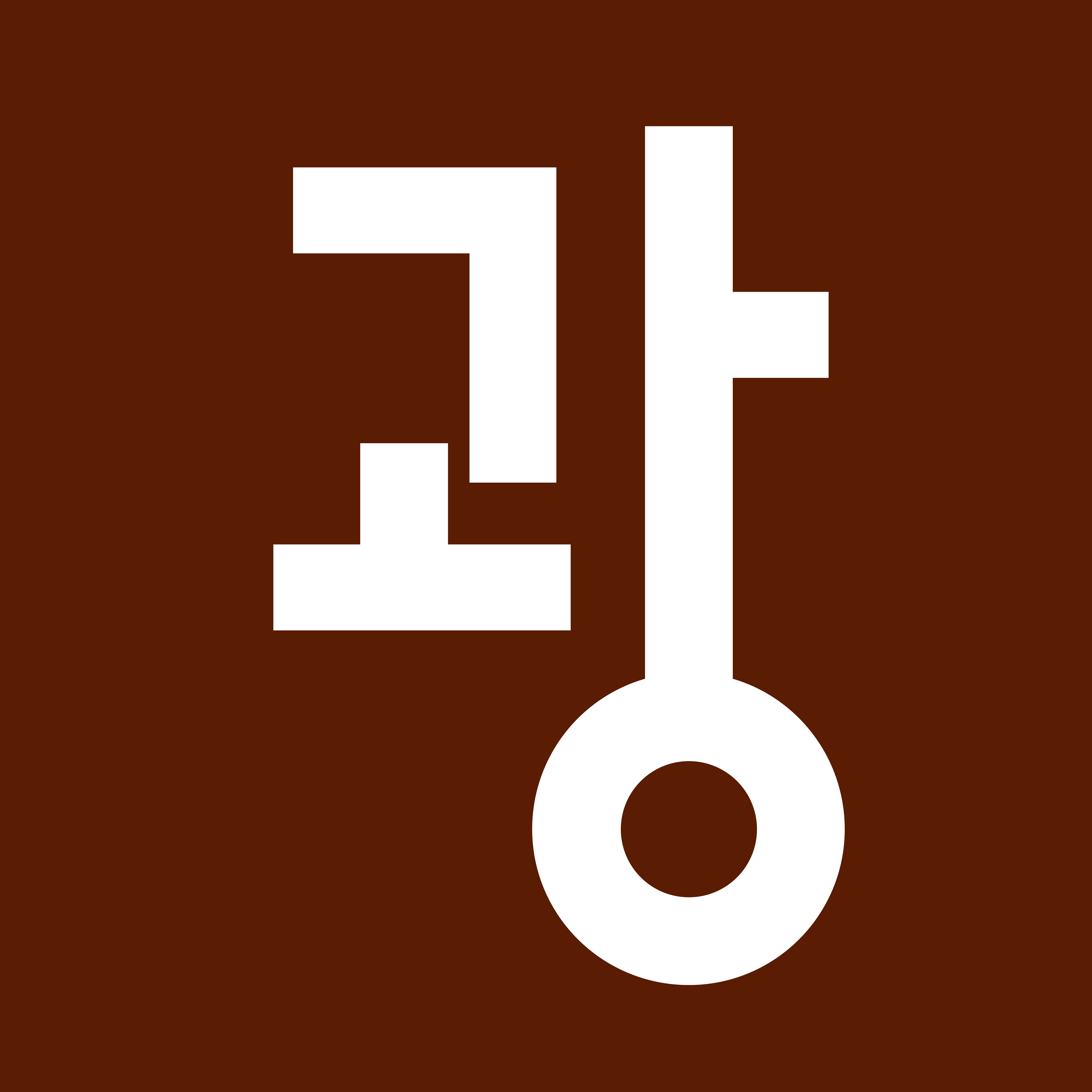

In 1985, he designed his first self-titled typeface, creating a path of experimentation for the Korean script. He created the Madang typeface for the monthly magazine Madang to overcome the general monotony and rigidity of existing Hangeul typefaces.

In 1988, he launched the alternative art and culture magazine bogoseo/bogoseo.

Ahn Sang-soo founded the alternative design school Paju Typography Institute (PaTI). He also founded the AG Typography Institute, an organization dedicated to the design and research of new typefaces.

Ahn has published several design books, and translated seminal works in typography of Jan Tschichold and Emil Ruder into Korean.

Ahn Sang-soo supposedly launched the first internet cafe in Korea.

== Other roles ==
1997-2001: Vice-president of ICOGRADA

== Prizes and awards ==
- 1983: Designer of the Year by Design Magazine
- Korea Newspaper Award
- 1998:Grand Prix from ZGRAF 8
- 2007: Gutenberg Prize by the German city of Leipzig
