= Cloakroom =

Room for people to hang their outerwear

A cloakroom, known as a coatroom and checkroom in North America, is a room for people to hang their coats, cloaks, canes, umbrellas, hats, or other outerwear when they enter a building. Cloakrooms are typically found inside large buildings, such as gymnasiums, schools, churches or meeting halls. In private homes, hatstands fulfill a similar function. In the UK, a cloakroom may also refer to a lavatory.

== Attendants ==
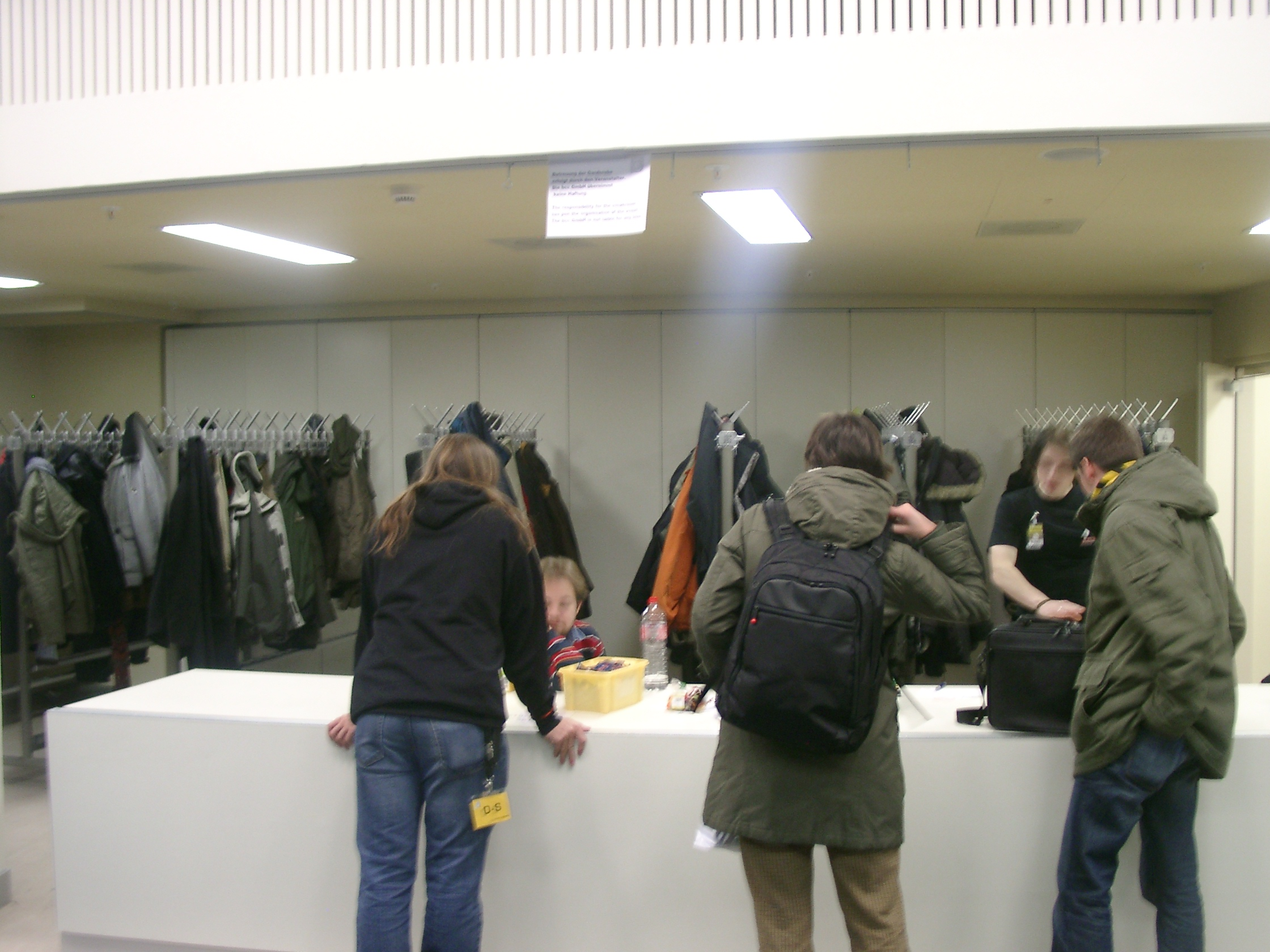
A cloakroom in Alexanderplatz, Berlin

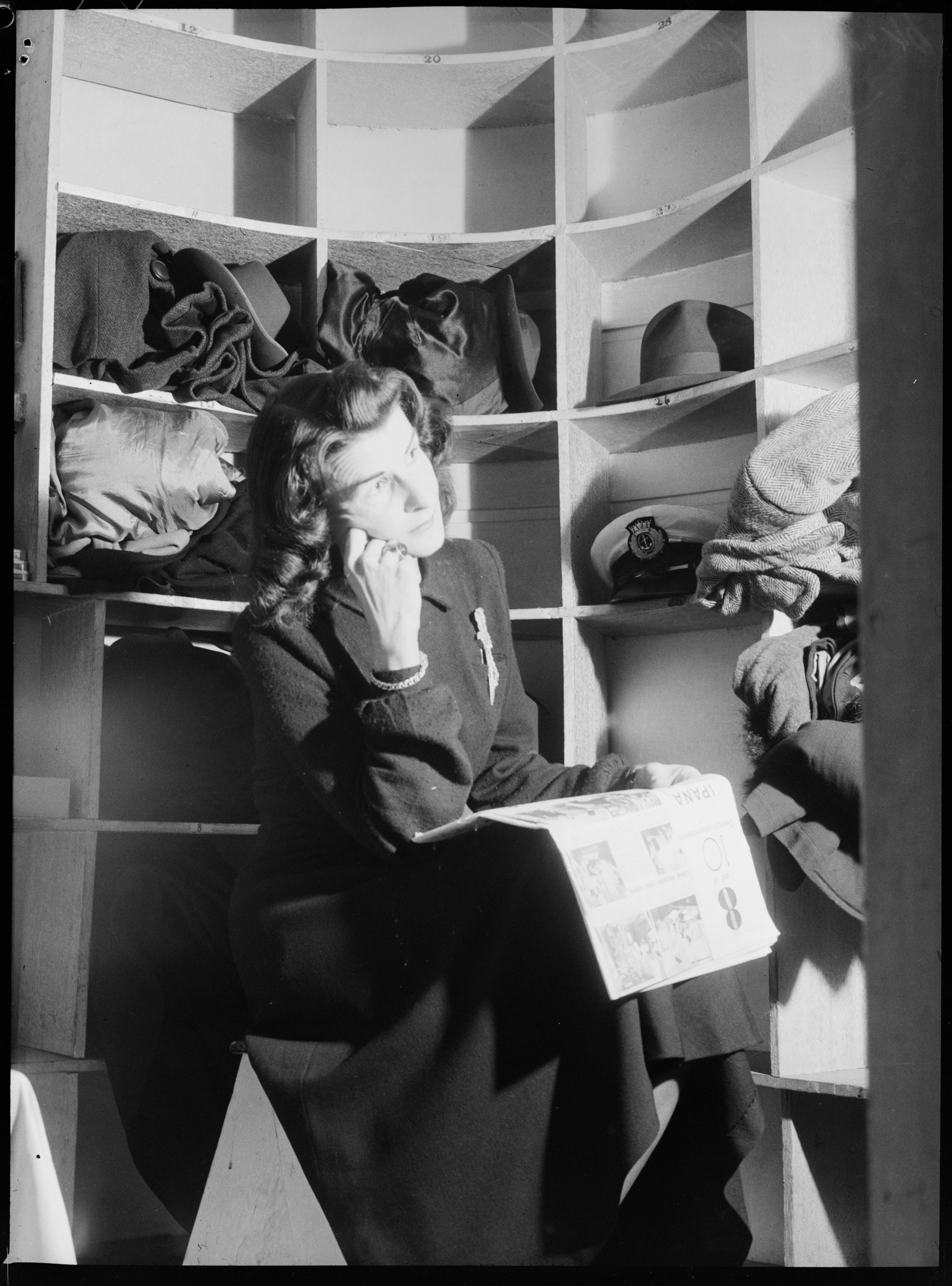
Hatcheck attendant, Trocadero, Kings Cross, Sydney, 1949

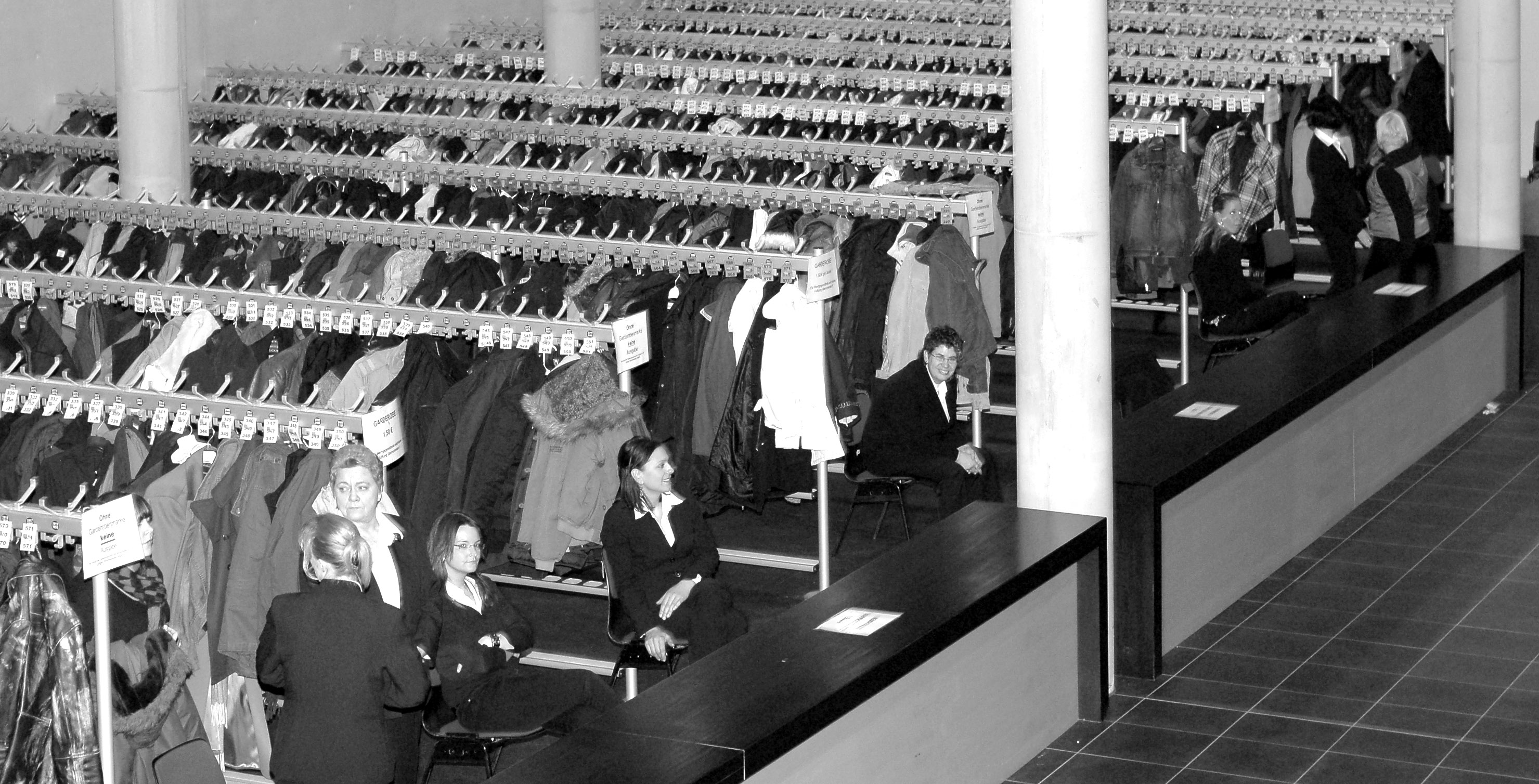
The cloakroom of the Hanns-Martin-Schleyer-Halle in Germany

Attended cloakrooms, or coat checks, are staffed rooms where coats and bags can be stored securely. Typically, a ticket or receipt is given to the customer, with a corresponding ticket attached to the garment or item. Coat checks are often found at the entrances to nightclubs, theaters, concert halls, larger restaurants, or museums. A fee may be charged, or a tip may be paid by the customer when they reclaim their item. Some coat checks post signs proclaiming any fees or tips, especially when their use is mandatory (as in many museums).

== India ==
In India, cloak rooms are available in all major railway stations, where railway passengers can keep their luggage for a specific amount of time. Some of the bigger stations have 24-hour staffed facilities, while the smaller ones operate only early morning to evening. This often suits day traders or pilgrims coming from smaller towns to larger cities and people waiting for a changeover to another train. Cloak rooms enable passengers to avoid carrying their luggage through the city while they conduct their business or tourism. The facilities are operated by the Commercial Department of Indian Railways at all major railway stations; smaller railway stations may not have this facility. A clerk collects the luggage from the passengers alighting from a train at that station or passengers having a train from that station, after verifying their tickets. The locked luggage bags are collected and a receipt is issued, mentioning the date and time the luggage was surrendered. The items are then stored on racks in the cloak room. Passengers are advised not to store valuable items or personal effects in the bags. On return, passengers show their receipt, pay the necessary charges to the clerk, and collect their items.

Apart from the availability of cloakrooms in major railway stations, cloakrooms are present in airports in major cities in the form of a left luggage facility. The left luggage facility is present in one of the terminals of the airport (usually the terminal used for international travel). The prices of storing luggage varies according to size of the luggage and the number of hours. Prices are more expensive as compared to those at railway stations. One would require a copy of their boarding pass and a valid ID proof to store their luggage.

== US Congress ==
The United States Congress "cloakrooms" are locations where members of Congress may interact outside the formal meeting rooms, and are used by both the Senate and the House of Representatives. The cloakrooms serve as a place for members to socialize, eat, and take naps without leaving the building. These rooms are closed to all except for Senators, Representatives, Senate Pages, and a few of their trusted staffers, and may even have their own private phone numbers.

== See also ==
- Coat closet
- Entryway
- Garderobe
