= Marcel Wanders =

Dutch industrial designer (born 1963)

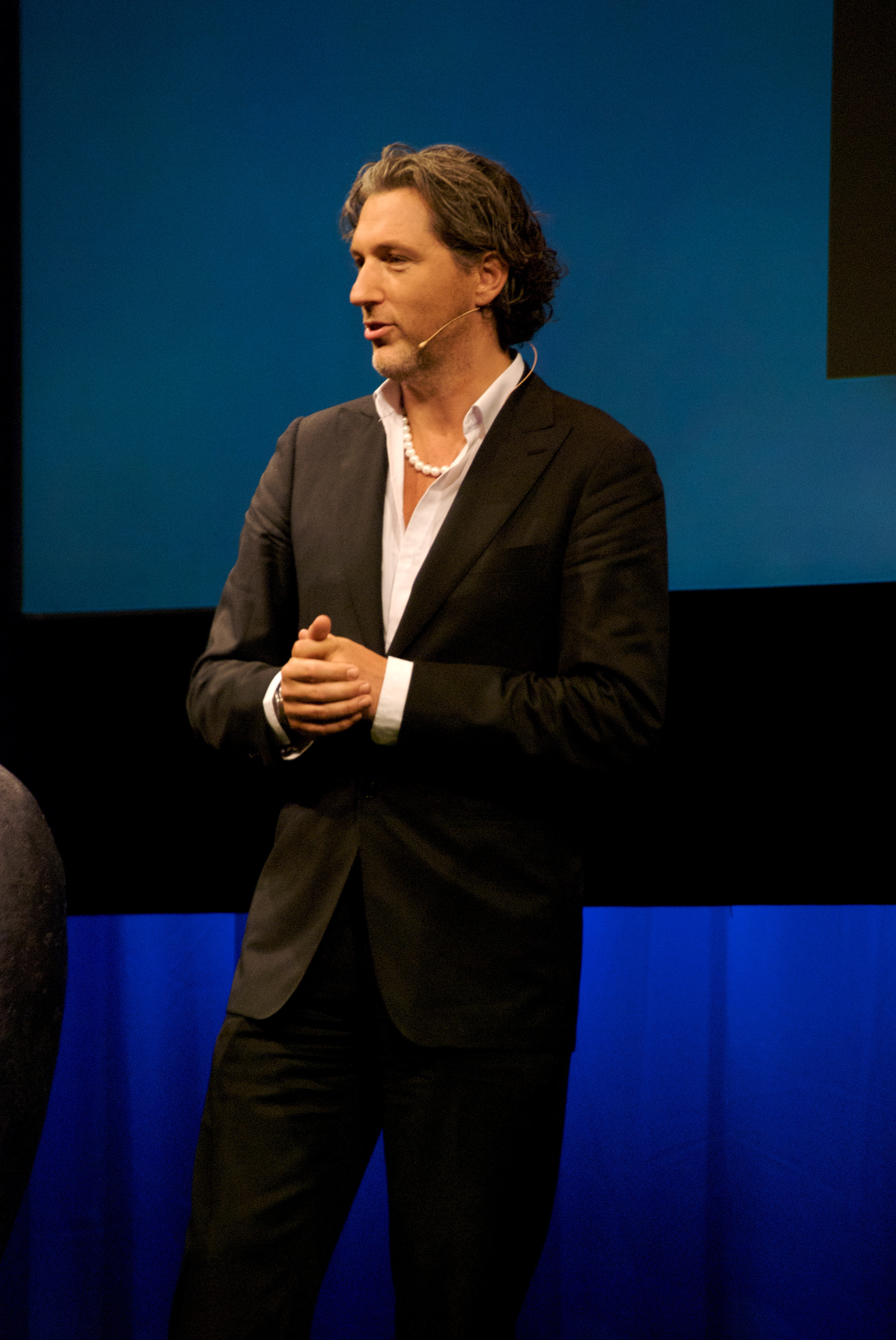
- Wanders in 2008
- Born: 2 July 1963 (age 63); Boxtel, Netherlands
- Education: Institute of the Arts Arnhem, Design Academy Eindhoven
- Occupations: Product designer Interior designer Architect
- Known for: Knotted Chair; Mondrian Hotel South Beach; Moooi
- Website: MarcelWanders.com

Marcel Wanders (born 2 July 1963) is a Dutch industrial and interior designer. He is the art director of the Marcel Wanders studio in Amsterdam and co-founder of the furniture and interior design company Moooi.

== Early life ==
Born in Boxtel, Wanders graduated cum laude from the Hogeschool voor de Kunsten Institute of the Arts Arnhem in 1988 after being expelled from the Design Academy Eindhoven.

== Career ==
In 2000 Wanders opened Marcel Wanders studio in Amsterdam, gaining attention in 1996 with his Knotted Chair, which paired high tech materials with 'low tech' production methods. Marcel Wanders is a product and interior design studio with clients such as Alessi, Baccarat, Bisazza, Christofle, Kosé, Flos, KLM, Hyatt, Laufen, LH&E Group, Louis Vuitton, Miramar Group, Morgans Hotel Group, Puma, Swarovski.

In 2001, with Casper Vissers, Wanders founded the design company Moooi, of which he is co-owner and art director. In 2014 Wanders worked as product and interior designer and art director work in his studio with around 50 international design specialists. They have realized over 1700+ projects for private clients and brands such as Cappellini and Flos. Julie Scelfo, writing for the New York Times in 2011 described Wanders as "the Lady Gaga of the design world" for being unconventional, creative and full of energy. Many of his designs combine historical influences with innovative materials.

Wanders received various design prizes, including the Rotterdam Design Prize and the Kho Liang Ie Prize. He has lectured at the San Francisco Museum of Modern Art, Limn, the Design Academy, Nike, IDFA, and FutureDesignDays. In July 2002 Business Week selected Marcel Wanders as one of Europe's '25 leaders of change'. Wanders is an advisory board member of THNK School of Creative Leadership.

Notable projects to date include interior architecture for such as the Andaz Amsterdam Prinsengracht Hotel, Kameha Grand hotel in Bonn, the Mondrian South Beach hotel in Miami, Quasar Istanbul Residences, and the Villa Moda flagship store in Bahrain, as well as private residences in Amsterdam and Mallorca.

In 2015, he was tapped by Revolution Precrafted to design a prefabricated house which he named Eden.

Many of Marcel Wanders' designs have been selected for design collections and exhibitions and featured in magazines. In 2006 he was elected International Designer of the Year by Elle Decoration. Wanders' first solo exhibition, 'Daydreams,’ in 2009, was held at the Philadelphia Museum of Art.

== Notable Projects ==
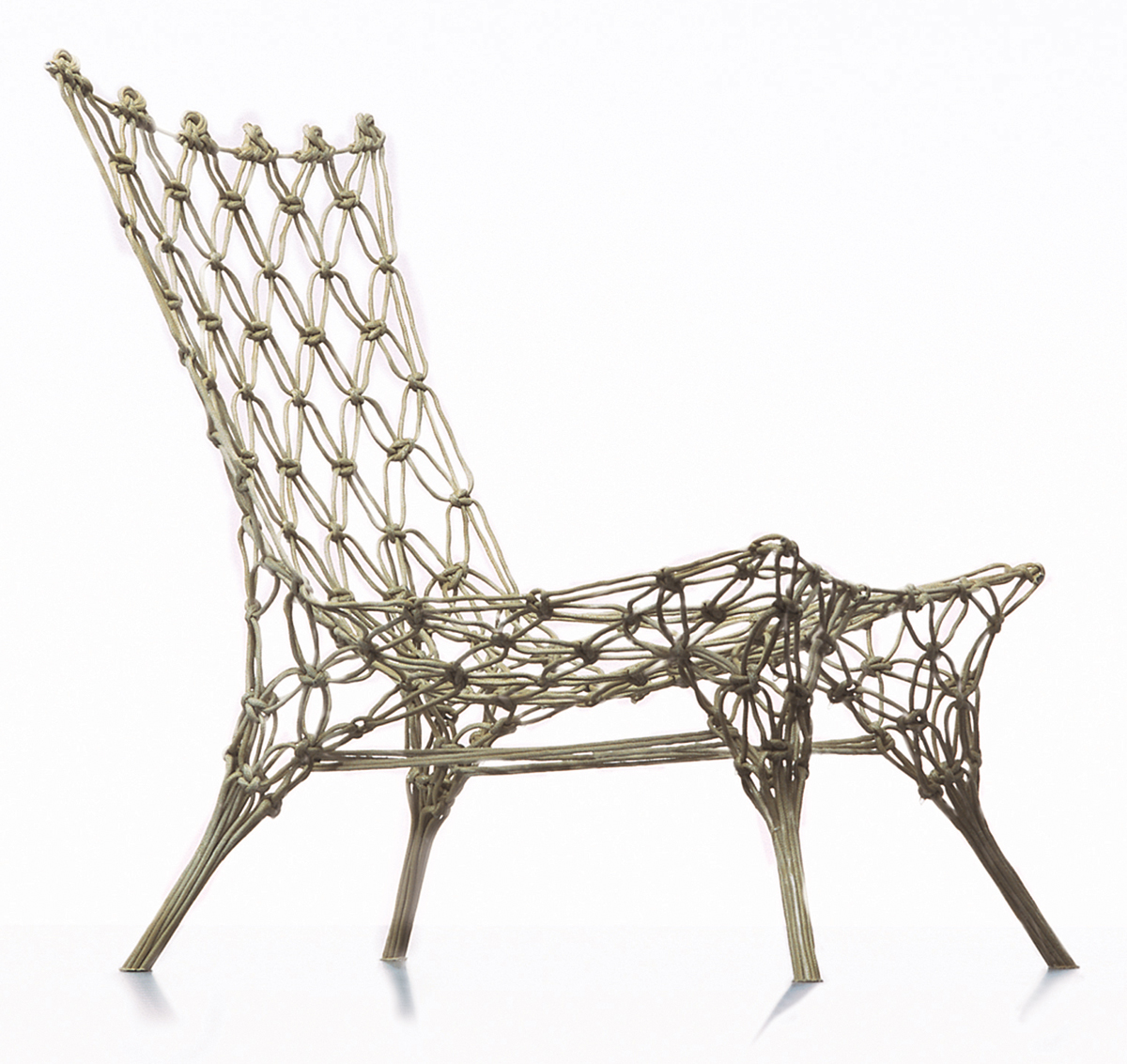
Knotted Chair, Droog, 1995.

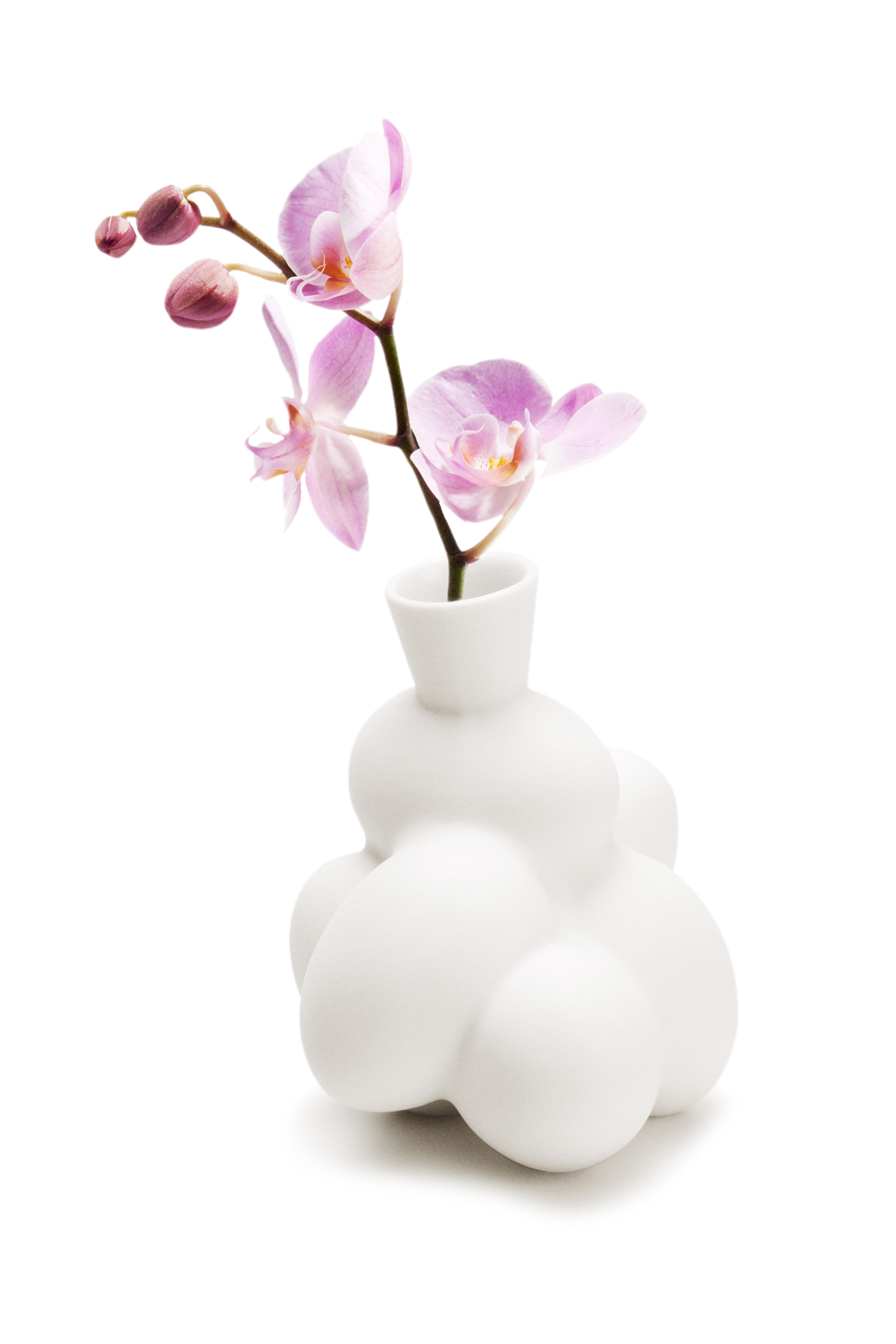
Egg Vase 1997

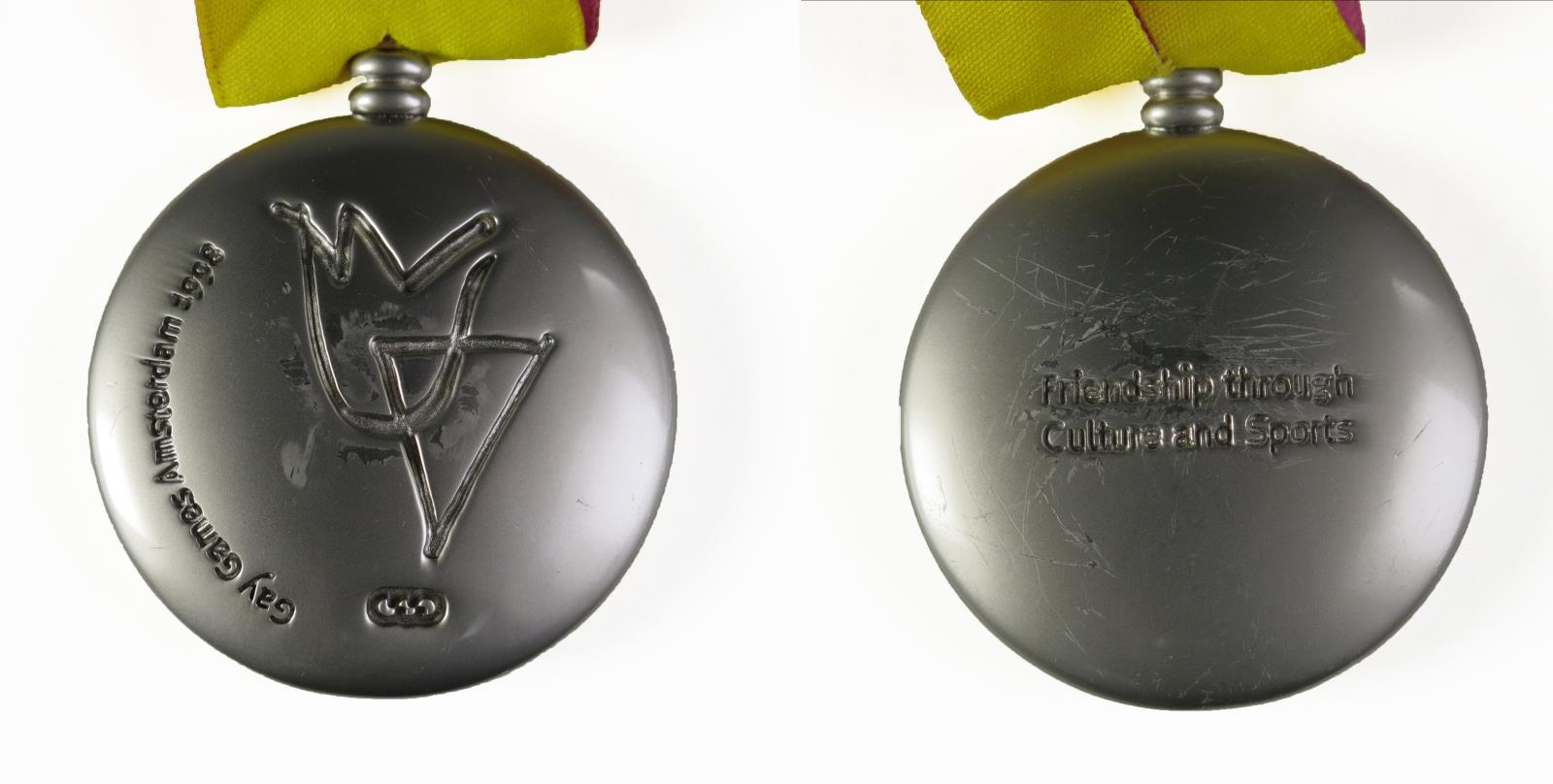
Gay Games participants medal, 1998

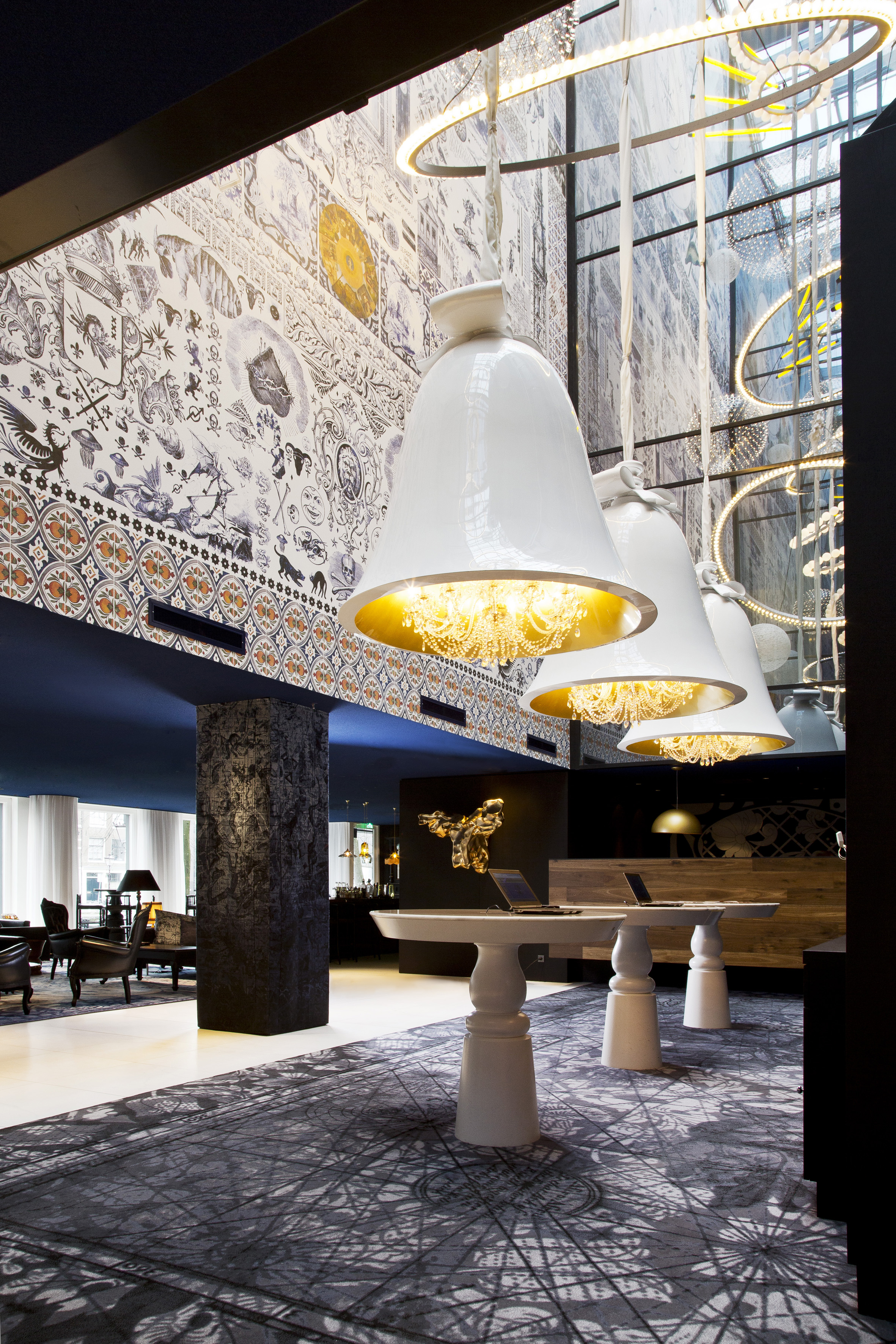
Andaz, Amsterdam 2012.

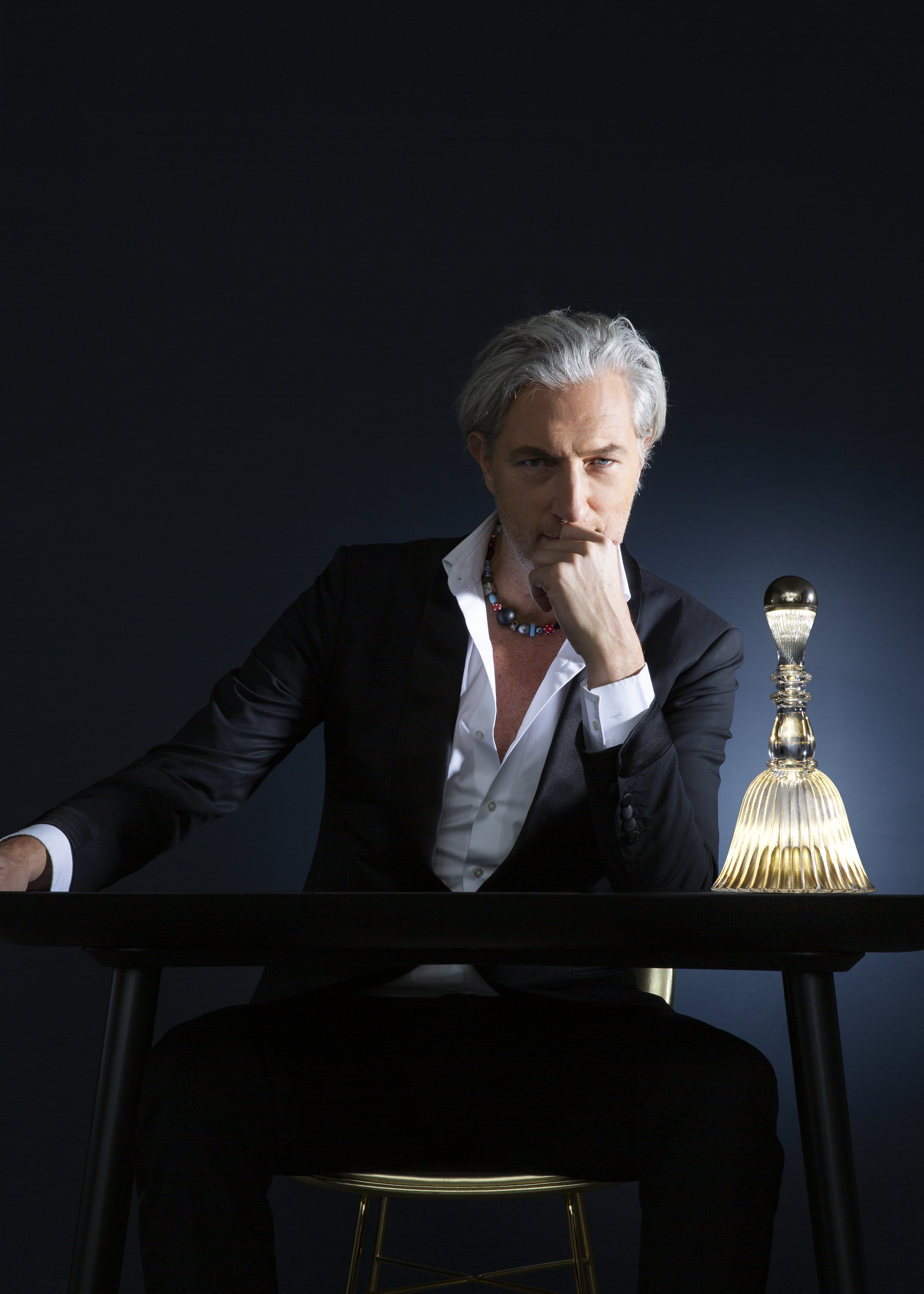
RAMUN Bella 2019.-2022 Best lighting of the year.

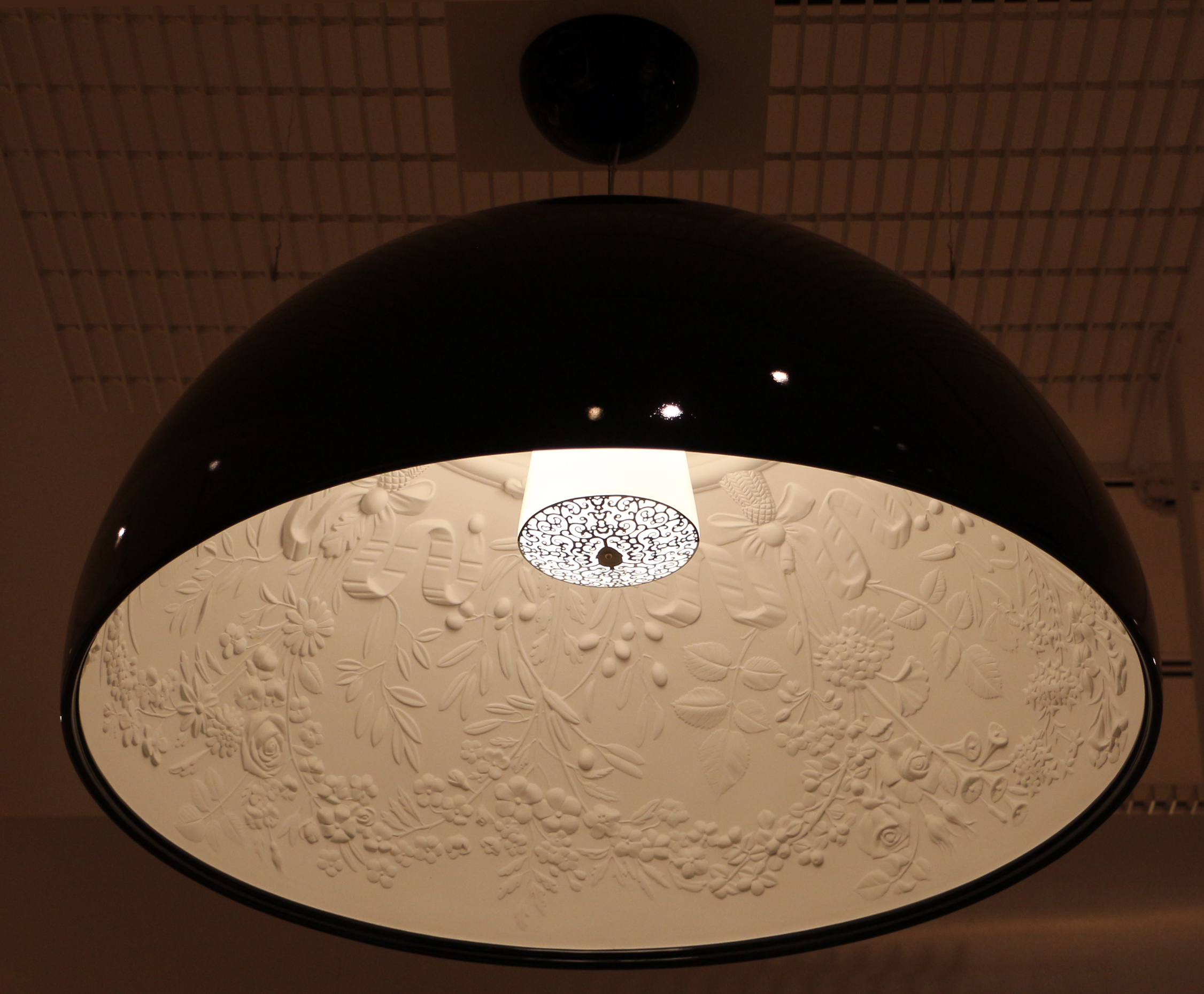
Skygarden pendant light designed for Flos, 2007

- Knotted Chair (1996)
- Egg Vase (1997)
- Amsterdam Gay Games participants medal (1998)
- Snotty Vase (2001)
- V.I.P. Chair (2000)
- Carbon Chair (2004)
- Crochet Chubby Low Armchair (2006)
- Skygarden S1 (2007)
- Westerhuis, Amsterdam, Netherlands (2008)
- Mondrian South Beach, Miami, Florida, United States (2008)
- Villa Moda, Bahrain (2009)
- Casa Son Vida, Palma, Mallorca, Spain (2009)
- Kameha Grand, Bonn, Germany (2009)
- COSME DECORTE 'AQMW' (Absolute Quality Miracle Wonder) Skin Care (2010)
- Monster Chair (2010)
- Tableware for KLM (2011)
- 'Dressed' tableware for Alessi (2011)
- Cosme Decorte 'AQMW' Absolute Quality Miracle Wonder Makeup (2012)
- Andaz Amsterdam Prinsengracht, Amsterdam, Netherlands (2012)
- Kameha Grand Zürich (2015)
- Chaise Longue (2015)
- Alessi Circus for Alessi (2016)
- Le Roi Soleil for Baccarat (2016)
- Jardin d’Eden Lighting Collection for Christofle (2016)
- Iberostar Portal Nous (2017)
- Mondrain Doha (2017)
- 'Rocking Chair' and 'Diamond Screen' for Louis Vuitton Objets Nomades Collection (2017)
- Quasar Istanbul, Istanbul, Turkey
- RAMUN Bella (in collaboration with Alessandro Mendini, 2019), named 2022 Best lighting of the year by the Chicago Athenaeum Museum of Architecture and Design and Global Design News

== Publications ==
- Wanders Wonders: Design for a New Age (1999) ISBN 90-6450-376-1
- Marcel Wanders: Behind The Ceiling (2009) ISBN 978-3-89955-234-8
- Marcel Wanders: Interiors (2011) ISBN 978-0-8478-3187-6
- Marcel Wanders: Pinned Up 25 Years of Design (2013)) ISBN 978-94-9172-728-3
