= Capria =

Capria is an Italian surname. Notable people with this surname include:

- Alana I. Capria, an American writer
- Carl Capria, a former American football defensive back
- Don Capria, an American writer
- Nicola Capria, an Italian politician
- Raffaele La Capria, an Italian novelist and screenwriter
- Rubén Capria, an Argentine former professional footballer
