= Conditional Design Manifesto =

Design method and manifesto by Luna Maurer, Jonathan Puckey, Roel Wouters and Edo Paulus

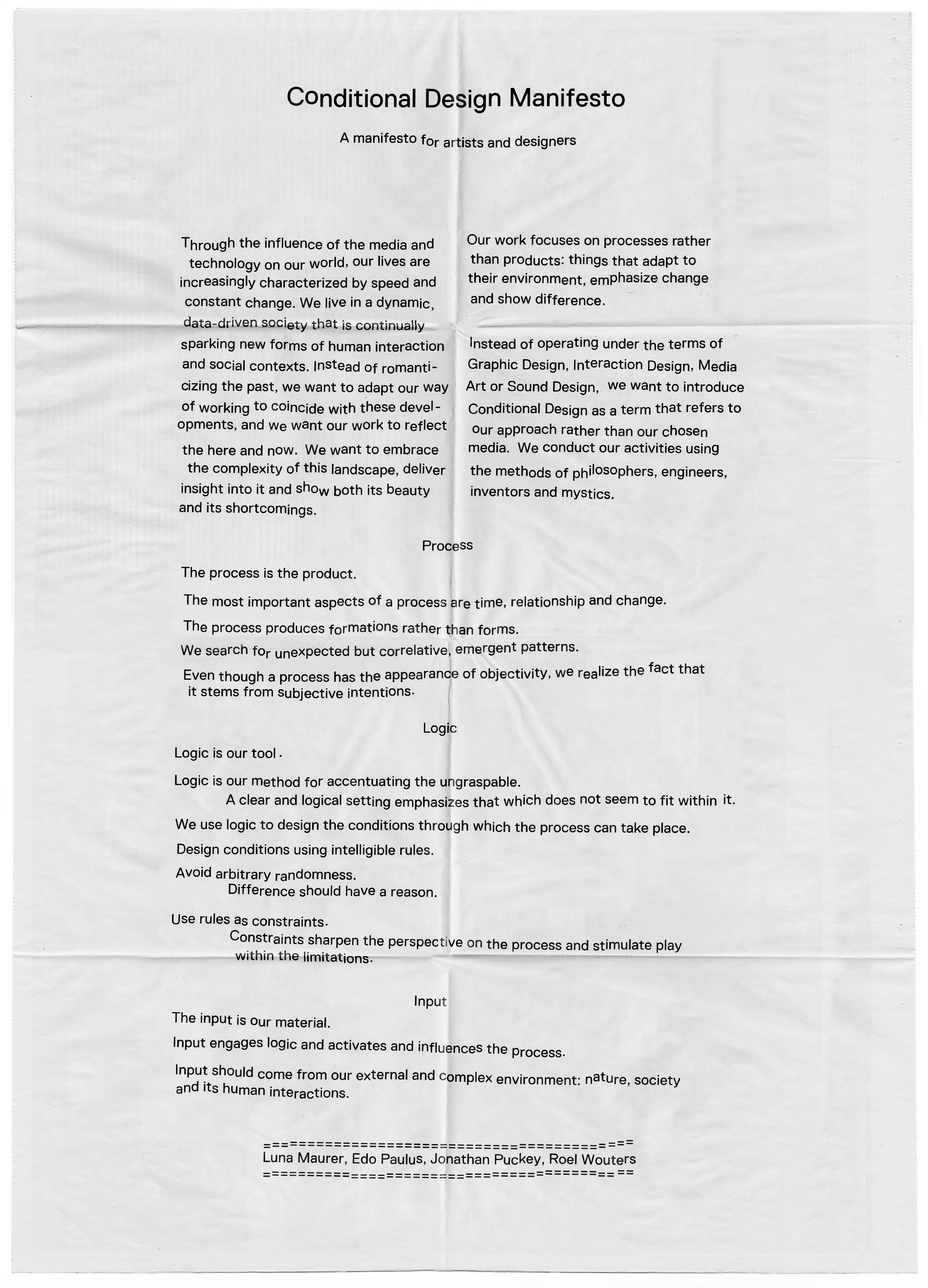
Conditional Design Manifesto

Conditional Design is a design method and manifesto formulated in 2008 by Luna Maurer, Edo Paulus, Jonathan Puckey, and Roel Wouters, The approach focuses on the design of rules, conditions and processes rather than on predetermined final forms . It is associated with collaborative, rule-based workshops in which participants work within a defined system to generate unpredictable results.

The group developed the Conditional Design Manifesto, which presents conditional design as an approach rather than a medium-specific design category. The method was later documented in the Conditional Design Workbook, published by Valiz in 2013.

== History ==
Conditional design originated from meetings between Luna Maurer, Edo Paulus, Jonathan Puckey and Roel Wouters in Amsterdam in 2008. According to an archived project description by EUDE, the group met weekly at Maurer's kitchen table, wrote the manifesto, organized workshops and published the results online.

The group described conditional design as a way to avoid being defined primarily by disciplinary labels such as graphic design, interaction design, media art or sound design. Instead, the manifesto introduced the term as a description of an approach to making, based on rules, logic, interaction and process.

Studio Moniker, the Amsterdam-based experimental design studio founded by Maurer, Wouters and Puckey in 2012, has often been associated with the later dissemination of Conditional Design. However, Moniker's own account distinguishes Conditional Design from the later studio, describing it as the result of earlier Tuesday-night meetings between Paulus, Puckey, Wouters and Maurer.

== Manifesto ==
The Conditional Design Manifesto defines conditional design as the act of designing environments, conditions and rules through which outcomes can emerge. Rather than treating design as the creation of a predetermined final form, it shifts the designer's responsibility toward shaping the systems and processes that make results possible.

The manifesto is structured around three central ideas: process, logic and input. Under "process", it states that the process is the product, emphasizing time, relationships and change over fixed form. Under "logic", it describes logic as a tool for designing the conditions through which a process can unfold, using intelligible rules and constraints rather than arbitrary randomness. Under "input", it identifies external material, including nature, society and human interaction, as the material that activates the process.

== Method ==
Conditional design is based on the creation of conditions and rules of play that invite cooperation within a regulated process, producing outcomes that are not fully predictable in advance. The method is described as one that plays with chance, frameworks and generative systems, while allowing each team to define its own rules. A Google Design reflection on SPAN 2015 states that the value of Conditional Design lies in its limitations: rules define the roles of participants while leaving room for interpretation, allowing collective results that exceed single authorship.

In practice, conditional design has often taken the form of group workshops or drawing games. Participants follow a shared set of instructions, and the final work emerges through the interaction between the rules, the participants and the circumstances of the session. It has been used to introduced algorithmic thinking in artistic contexts. The workbook site describes the systems as simple, but the processes as challenging, collaborative and often surprising.

== Conditional Design Workbook ==
The Conditional Design Workbook was published by Valiz in 2013. The book contains 176 pages and was published in English as a paperback with the ISBN 978-90-78088-58-5. Its contributors include the Conditional Design group, Andrew Blauvelt and Koert van Mensvoort, with design by Julia Born, assisted by Nina Paim.

Valiz describes the book as a "do-book" for designers and artists, intended to make the method easy to adopt. The publication presents the method step by step and includes workshop formats, exercises and documentation.

It's Nice That covered the book in 2013, describing it as a hands-on guide to the ideas behind the Conditional Design manifesto. The article noted that the workbook made the theoretical ideas of the manifesto accessible through participatory team games and essays that placed the exercises in a wider conceptual framework.

== Reception and use ==
Conditional design has been discussed in design and cultural contexts as an example of process-led and rule-based design. In 2013, the Walker Art Center presented Luna Maurer as part of its Insights Design Lecture Series, describing her work in relation to the Conditional Design manifesto and noting her use of deceptively simple rules to create complex participatory works.

Playgrounds described conditional design as both a manifesto and an experimental playground, based on the idea that designing a logic-based environment in which results take shape can be more fruitful than directly designing an object. The same source noted that the method was tested through weekly workshops and later collected in the Conditional Design Workbook.

The Amsterdam cultural institution Mediamatic hosted the launch of the Conditional Design Workbook in May 2013, presenting the method as one that plays with chance, frameworks and generative systems to produce unpredictable results through a regulated process.

== Publication ==
- Conditional Design Workbook. Amsterdam: Valiz, 2013. Contributors: Conditional Design Team, Andrew Blauvelt and Koert van Mensvoort. Design: Julia Born, assisted by Nina Paim. ISBN 978-90-78088-58-5.

== See also ==
- Generative design
- Interaction design
- Participatory design
- Graphic design
- Algorithmic art
- Systems art
