= Jenske Dijkhuis =

Dutch artist

Jenske Dijkhuis (born 1980, in Amsterdam) is a Dutch designer, working primarily with spatial concepts, currently living in Amsterdam and working in an old factory building in Zaandam.

== Biography ==
Dijkhuis attended the Gerrit Rietveld Academy where she studied under Frank Tjepkema, Peik Suyling, and Thonik. While there, she worked under Marcel Wanders and interned at Droog Design. Since graduating, Dijkhuis has founded her own studio and won the Wood Challenge 2007. This project has been widely covered and can found in Frame Magazine and a number of books including Spacecraft (Klanten/Feireiss 2007) and Bodyscape (Danoi 2007). Other projects include a design that was included in Robodock, a festival of art and theater in Amsterdam. In Platform 21, an exhibition of architectural maquettes, as both examplar and concepts.

== Recent projects ==
Currently, she is working on an exhibition design for Amsterdam International Fashion Week at Horse Move Project Space, a pavilion for the art and theater festival Licht aan Zee (Light at Sea) in Den Helder, as well participating the exhibition Jong Land at the Kunstzomer in Anna Paulowna.
