= Tim Leyendekker =

Dutch film director, writer, editor and producer

- Born: 1973; Netherlands
- Occupation(s): Director, writer, editor, producer, visual artist
- Years active: 2001 – present

Tim Leyendekker is a Dutch film director and writer. He is best known for his debut feature film, Feast, and the short films, The Healers and BLINDER.

== Career ==
Leyendekker earned his Master of Fine Arts degree from the Sandberg Institute in Amsterdam and studied at the Willem de Kooning Academy in Rotterdam.

Leyendekker's debut feature film, Feast, had its world premiere at the International Film Festival Rotterdam. His work has also been shown in various art institutions such as Power Plant Contemporary Art Gallery, MMX Open Art Venue, W139 and Museum Boijmans Van Beuningen.

== Filmography ==
Year	Title	Contribution	Note
2001	(hectaren)	Director, writer	Short film
2003	How the West Was Won and Where It Got Us	Director, writer, editor and producer	Short film
2005	still	Director, writer, editor and producer	Short film
2009	Opening Night	Director, writer, editor and producer	Short film
2010	The Healers	Director, writer, editor and producer	Short film
2015	BLINDER	Director, writer, editor and producer	Short film
2021	Feast	Director and writer	Feature film

== Awards and nominations ==
Year	Result	Award	Category	Work	Ref.
2011	Won	Netherlands Film Fund	Stimulansprijs	The Healers	
2015	Nominated	International Film Festival Rotterdam	Tiger Award for Short Film	BLINDER	
2015	Nominated	Ji.hlava IDFF	Best Experimental Documentary	BLINDER	
2021	Nominated	International Film Festival Rotterdam	Tiger Award	Feast	
2021	Won	Cinéma du Réel	CNAP Award	Feast	
2021	Won	Vilnius International Film Festival	Special Mention	Feast	
