= MAD Brussels =

Fashion and design centre in Brussels, Belgium

Brussels Centre for Fashion and Design MAD Brussels
- Centre bruxellois de la Mode et du Design (French); Brussels Centrum voor Mode en Design (Dutch)
- Interactive fullscreen map
- Established: 10 December 2010; 15 years ago
- Location: Place du Nouveau Marché aux Grains / Nieuwe Graanmarkt 10, 1000 City of Brussels, Brussels-Capital Region, Belgium
- Coordinates: 50°51′4″N 4°20′39″E
- Director: Anaïs Sandra Carion
- Public transit access: 1 5 Sainte-Catherine/Sint-Katelijne
- Website: mad.brussels/en

The Brussels Centre for Fashion and Design (French: Centre bruxellois de la Mode et du Design; Dutch: Brussels Centrum voor Mode en Design), operating under the brand name Mode and Design Brussels (MAD Brussels), is a fashion and design centre in Brussels, Belgium. It was established in 2010 by the City of Brussels and the Brussels-Capital Region as a non-profit association to promote the city as a hub for designers and creators. Shortly afterwards, the existing associations Modo Brussels and Designed in Brussels merged into the new organisation.

In 2017, MAD Brussels moved into a new building located between the Place du Nouveau Marché aux Grains/Nieuwe Graanmarkt and the Rue du Rempart des Moines/Papenvest. The project, carried out by the architectural firm V+ in collaboration with Rotor, transformed three existing buildings into a single complex dominated by white interiors. The redevelopment cost more than €8 million, financed by the city, the region, and the European Union. Nowadays, together with the French Community, these institutions remain sponsors of MAD Brussels, which employs fourteen staff members.

== History ==
The Brussels Centre for Fashion and Design was officially established on 10 December 2010, a joint initiative of the Brussels-Capital Region, the City of Brussels, and the European Union. Its purpose was to unite Brussels' fashion and design sectors, support emerging designers, and provide a platform for industry collaboration. It succeeded earlier initiatives, including Modo Brussels and Designed in Brussels, and was directed by Alexandra Lambert.

Prior to its establishment, the City of Brussels had acquired a building in the Dansaert Quarter in 2009 to host the centre, and an architectural competition was held in 2010 to select the design. MAD Brussels opened on 20 April 2017 in a renovated complex between the Place du Nouveau Marché aux Grains/Nieuwe Graanmarkt and the Rue du Rempart des Moines/Papenvest. The building, designed by the architectural firm V+ in collaboration with Rotor, merged three existing structures while maintaining much of the original volume, creating multifunctional workspaces, workshops, and exhibition rooms.

The opening exhibition, "Occupation: Designer – Brussels Vision on Design", was developed with the communication agency DAMNation and featured work made entirely in Brussels by designers including Annelys de Vet, Bas Smets, Benjamin Loyauté, Laurence Soetens, Thomas Lommée, C. Hogner, and Xavier Lust. The exhibition explored alternative approaches to design terminology and practice.

== See also ==
- List of museums in Brussels
- History of Brussels
- Culture of Belgium
