= Roel Wouters =

Dutch designer, director, artist (born 1976)

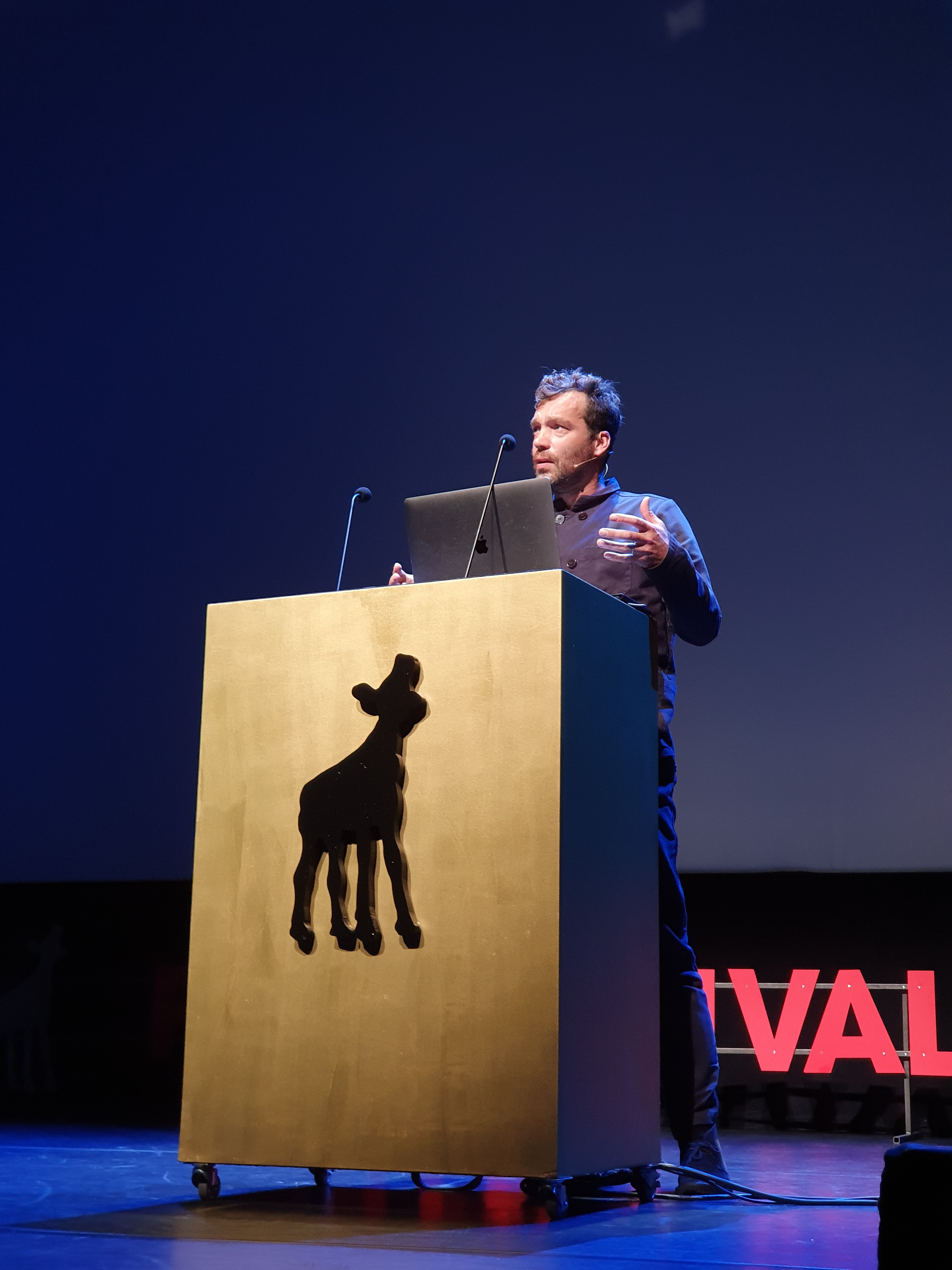
- Roel Wouters at Netherlands Film Festival, 2019
- Born: February 20, 1976; Haarlem, Netherlands
- Years active: 2000s–present
- Known for: Conditional Design; Designing Friction; interactive and participatory media works
- Notable work: zZz is playing: Grip, Do Not Touch, Clickclickclick.click, Do Not Draw a Penis, Emoji Is All We Have, Deep Soup
- Website: roelwouters.com

Roel Wouters (was born 1976 in Haarlem, Netherlands) is a Dutch artist, designer, director, and educator based in Amsterdam. His practice spans interactive installations, web based works, music videos, films, publications, and performances, and has been presented internationally by museums, film festivals, and cultural institutions. He is co-founder of Moniker, an award-winning, experimental design studio in Amsterdam (2012–2023) researching the social effects of technology.

== Education ==
Wouters studied graphic design at the Royal Academy of Art, The Hague and later completed a Master of Fine Arts degree at the Sandberg Institute in Amsterdam.

== Career and teaching ==
He has taught media courses at the Gerrit Rietveld Academy, the Sandberg Institute, Royal Academy of Art, The Hague, Piet Zwart Institute, Rotterdam. (HfG) Karlsruhe and at Yale University School of Art. He gives workshops and lectures at universities, symposia and international art festivals. He is leading Melting Realities, a studio part of the bachelor program at Design Academy Eindhoven.

=== Conditional Design Manifesto (2008) ===
Wouters is a co-author of Conditional Design Manifesto, alongside Luna Maurer, Jonathan Puckey, and Edo Paulus proposing an approach to design in which creators define rules, constraints, and conditions rather than directly shaping final outcomes. Within this framework, the role of the designer shifts from authoring finished objects to constructing systems in which results emerge through interaction, chance, and collaboration. They proposed Conditional Design as a response to traditional, linear design methods.

The methodology has been disseminated through the Conditional Design Workbook, which presents the manifesto alongside documented workshops and practical exercises. The publication is designed as a “do-book,” enabling educators, designers, and students to apply Conditional Design principles directly in studio, academic, and community-based environments. The principles of Conditional Design were documented in the Conditional Design Workbook (2013), published by Valiz. Koert van Mensvoort and Andrew Blauwvelt both wrote an essay in the publication.

=== Designing Friction ===
In 2023 Roel Wouters and Luna Maurer presented Designing Friction: a call for friction in digital culture, an online manifesto questioning the pursuit of seamless digital experiences and products. It proposes friction as means of encouraging human connection. The project was presented during IDFA Doclab in 2023 and published by Hato Press. Alexandra Barancová was co-author.

=== Selected works ===
==== zZz is playing: Grip (2007) ====
A one-take, locked off, top shot music video for the band zZz, recorded live, as part of the opening of Nederclips, a show celebrating Dutch music video culture at the Stedelijk Museum in 's-Hertogenbosch in 2007. Nominee at the 2008 Dutch Design Awards and winner of awards at Festival du Clip, France and Playgrounds Festival, Tilburg.

==== Do Not Touch (2013) ====
An interactive, crowd-sourced music video for the track “Kilo” by the Dutch band Light Light.The project transforms participants’ computer pointer movements into a shared visual composition, collecting and layering cursors from successive users within a single interface. The work reflects on the cultural role of the computer pointer as a long-standing interface between user and machine, foregrounding it at a time when touch-based interaction was becoming dominant. Participants are prompted to complete simple tasks and respond to questions while their enlarged cursors are recorded and combined with those of earlier users, creating a cumulative, collective performance. Do Not Touch won a Dutch Design Award in 2013

==== Clickclickclick.click (2016) ====
An interactive browser-based artwork co-produced by VPRO Medialab that examines online surveillance, data profiling, and behavioral monetization. Visitors encounter a minimal interface featuring a single interactive element; once interaction begins, every mouse movement and click is measured, recorded, and evaluated. As users navigate the site, written observations and a narrated voice respond to their behavior, drawing speculative and often exaggerated conclusions by comparing their actions to those of previous participants. By combining quantitative tracking with subjective interpretation, the project foregrounds how seemingly insignificant online actions can be monitored, categorized, and judged within data-driven systems. Clickclickclick.click premiered at IDFA DocLab.

==== Do Not Draw a Penis (2018) ====
An automated moderation artwork by Luna Maurer and Roel Wouters commissioned by the Mozilla Foundation and presented at Haus der Kulturen der Welt, Berlin. It critically examines algorithmic content moderation and moral norms embedded in large-scale digital platforms. The project responds to the release of Google's Quick, Draw! dataset, an open-source collection of more than 15 million user-generated drawings across hundreds of categories, from which certain subjects were deliberately excluded. Do Not Draw a Penis functions as an agent that invites participants to submit drawings that fall outside the moderation guidelines commonly enforced by major technology and social media platforms. These drawings are collected and formatted to match the structure of Google's dataset, thereby foregrounding how cultural and moral boundaries are encoded in data-driven systems and widely accepted by users. The projects collected drawings, have been made publicly available through an open online repository.

==== Touch for Luck (2022) ====
Multiplayer interactive game commissioned by M+ Museum for Visual Culture, Hong Kong. A virtual pond got projected on the M+ Facade from 27 January to 17 April 2022 and 13 January to 5 February 2023.The work asks the viewers to keep their finger on their device as long as possible themating screen addiction and game mechanics optimised for attention retention.

==== Emoji Is All We Have (2023) ====
Emoji is all we have is a film in four parts revolving around the relationship between humans and machines. Featuring Luna Maurer and Roel Wouters dressed up as emoji discussing whether digitalisation manoeuvre us towards a more rational, frictionless and optimised world. The layered complex expressions on their faces are filmed in closeup and are presented with matching emoji. Screened in Het Nieuwe Instituut. and M+.

==== Deep Soup (2025) ====
Participatory short sci-fi film featuring Hugo Hamlet about the rise of a new intelligence, Deep Soup, learning from matter, not from data. Selected for the IDFA DocLab Competition for Digital Storytelling.
