= Sandberg Institute =

Art school in Amsterdam, Netherlands

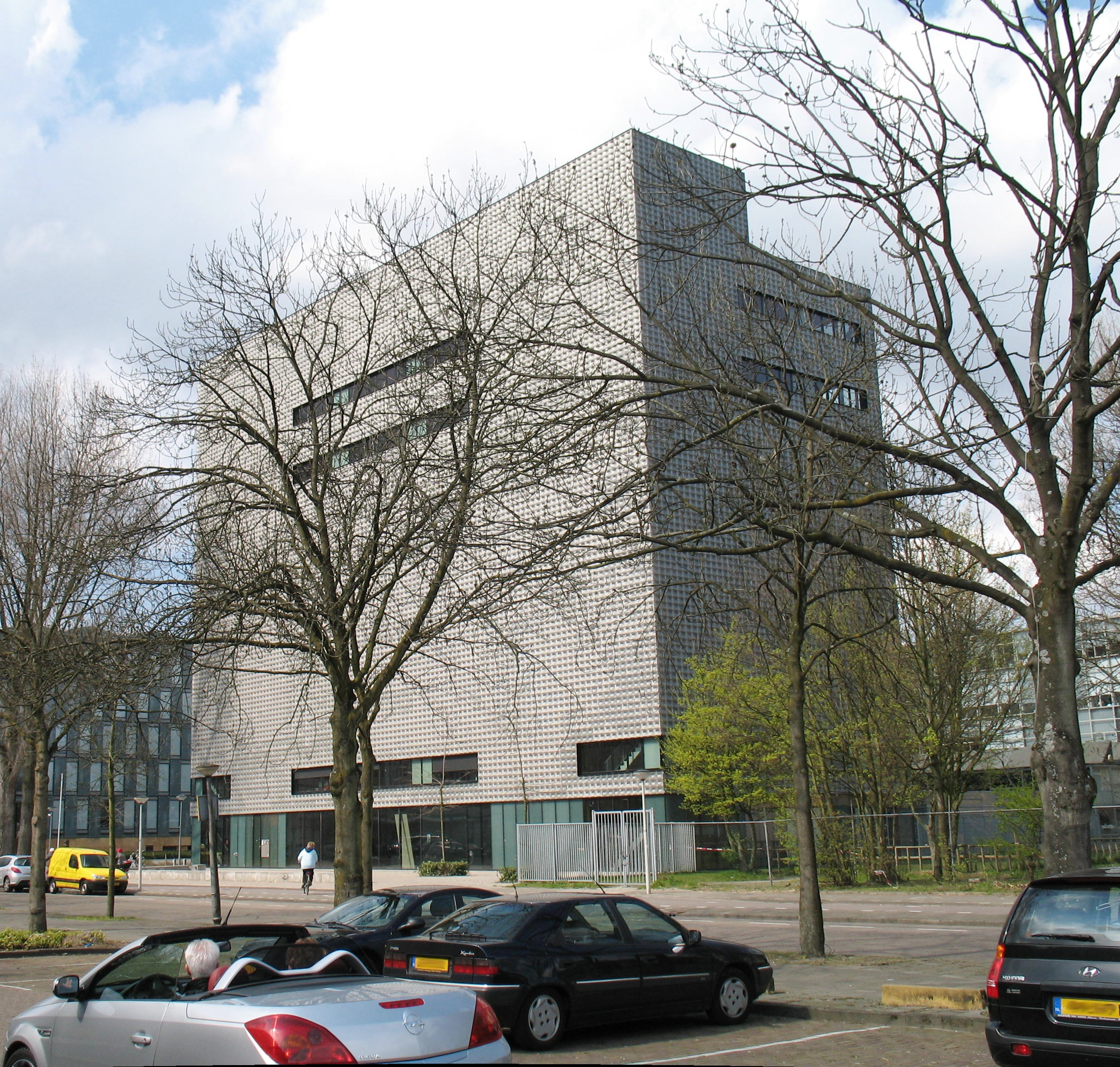
The Sandberg Institute

The Sandberg Institute (Dutch: Sandberg Instituut) is a postgraduate institution in Amsterdam that offers the master's programme of the Gerrit Rietveld Academy. It is named after Willem Sandberg. Since 1995, the Sandberg Institute has been offering a number of master's programmes in art and design. The director of the Sandberg Institute since 2023 is Ruby Hoette.

== History ==
The Sandberg Institute was first founded in 1990 by Simon den Hartog, a former director of Gerrit Rietveld Academy, originally to organise post-academic activities that included seminars and exhibitions. It is named after Willem Sandberg, the former director of the Stedelijk Museum Amsterdam, designer and advocate of the new and others in art. In 1995, it developed into the postgraduate department of the Gerrit Rietveld Academy. Under its director Jos Houweling, it offered four MA programmes in art and design: Fine Arts, Applied Arts, Design, and Interior Architecture.

Jos Houweling retired in 2010, and he was succeeded by Jurgen Bey. Bey introduced a series of two-year Temporary Programmes starting in 2011, such as Vacant NL, School of Missing Studies, Material Utopias, Materialism in Art, Master of Voice, and others. In 2017, Sandberg also introduced Hosted Programmes in collaboration with other institutions and companies, starting with the Master Design of Experiences introduced with the University of the Underground.

Sandberg is housed in the building designed by Benthem & Crouwel in 2003, and it also occupies part of a new building by FedLev and Hootsmans Architects built in 2019. Sandberg now has five main permanent departments: Critical Studies, Design, The Dirty Art Department (Applied Arts), Fine Arts, and Studio for Immediate Spaces (Interior Architecture), and introduces a new temporary department each year. The current temporary departments are Lumbung Practice (2024-2026) and Monstrous Futurities (2025-2027).

== Designs ==
The design department is based on engagement and experiment. From 2002 to 2008, the department was led by designer/artist Mieke Gerritzen, and from 2008 to 2019 by designer and initiator Annelys de Vet.

=== Mediafonds@Sandberg ===
From 2005 to 2013, the Media Fonds and the Sandberg Institute co-organised the masterclass Mediafonds@Sandberg (formerly Stifo@Sandberg). Experienced media makers and designers looked together for new forms of storytelling and work on a self-formulated research question that resulted in a demo for a cultural media production. Each year, a main theme was chosen which, according to the organizers, had social urgency. The aim was to develop other, new or experimental forms of media by bringing together people and organisations from different media fields and by creating overarching insights and synergy. The master class was for the participants a broadening of the field and a deepening on thematic parts. The master class took the form of a laboratory: thematically defined with coherence between the projects and additional lectures. It was organized from the Sandberg Institute, in collaboration with the Media Fund and an annually changing third party.

=== Artvertising ===
The building in which the Sandberg Institute has been housed since 2005 received widespread attention after it was used temporarily in the Artvertising project of Teun Castelein, then a student in the design department. Artvertising was a spatial interpretation of The Million Dollar Homepage, a 2005 internet project by Alex Tew. For this project, Castelein sold the facade of the building in Amsterdam as an advertising space at €19.99 a tile, and over 300 companies, institutions and individuals bought 13,000 of its tiles. It was official opened on 13 December 2006.

== Autonomous art ==
The Autonomous Art department was one of the master's programs in liberal arts in the Netherlands. In the past, the department organized De Kunstvlaai, which is an alternative Dutch art's fair every two years for artists initiatives and other master courses in the arts.

== Free Design ==
The Free Design department focused on spatial design. Marjan Unger was head of the department from 1995 to 2006.

== Alumni ==
- Bas Bouman
- Heimir Björgúlfsson
- Iris Bodemer
- Helen Britton
- Broersen and Lukács
- Margi Geerlinks
- Hendrik-Jan Grievink
- Gunnhildur Hauksdóttir
- Floris Kaayk
- Dafna Kaffeman
- Sina Khani
- Chequita Nahar
- Evert Nijland
- Tina Rath
- Frank Tjepkema
- Terhi Tolvanen
- Koert van Mensvoort
- Tim Leyendekker
- Duran Lantink
- Roel Wouters

== See also ==
- Gerrit Rietveld Academy
- De Kunstvlaai (in Dutch)
