= Jodie Lyn-Kee-Chow =

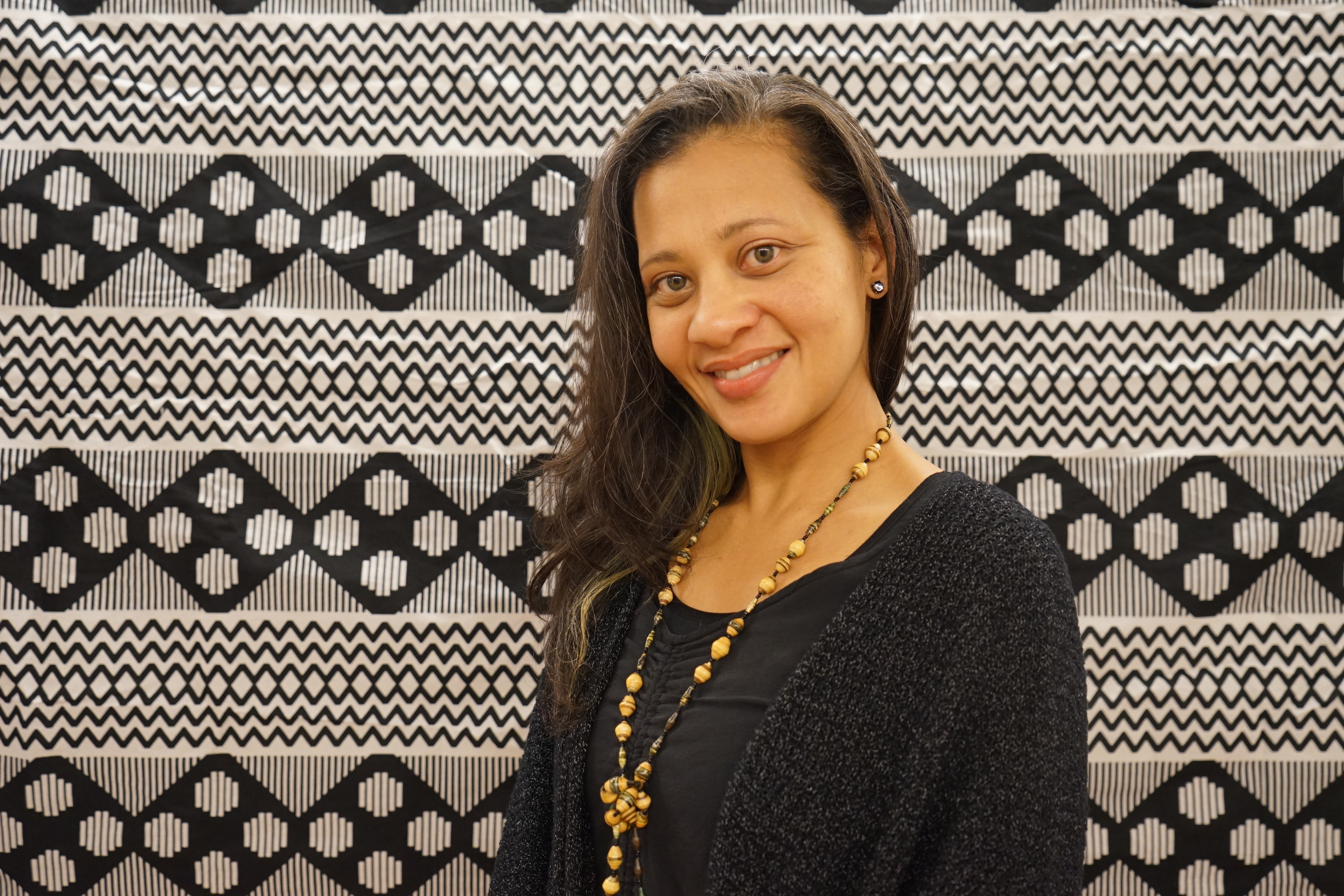
- Jodie Lyn-Kee-Chow
- Born: 1975; Manchester Parish, Jamaica
- Education: University of Florida, Hunter College
- Known for: Installation art, performance art
- Awards: Franklin Furnace Fund

Jodie Lyn-Kee-Chow (born 1975 in Manchester, Jamaica) is an American interdisciplinary artist based in New York City. She is best known for her work in performance art. She teaches at the School of Visual Arts, and is a mentor in the New York Foundation for the Arts' Immigrant Artist Mentoring Program.

== Education ==
Lyn-Kee-Chow grew up in South Florida and holds a BFA from the University of Florida, and an MFA from Hunter College.

== Exhibitions ==
Her work has been exhibited at the Queens Museum of Art, Exit Art, Panoply Performance Laboratory, the Museum of Contemporary African Diasporic Arts, the Art Museum of the Americas, Grace Exhibition Space, the Open Contemporary Art Center in Beijing, and other institutions.

== Recognition ==
Lyn-Kee-Chow's work has been reviewed in the Huffington Post, Hyperallergic, and other publications. She has received awards from the Rema Hort Mann Foundation, the New York Foundation for the Arts, the Franklin Furnace Fund, the Queens Council on the Arts, and the Consulate General of the United States, Guangzhou. Her work is in the collections of the National Gallery of Jamaica and the Bianca Lanza Gallery in Miami Beach, among other institutions. Lyn-Kee-Chow is a former member of the tART Collective.
