= Suzanne Broughel =

American artist

Suzanne Broughel is a multidisciplinary American artist based in New York City. Her work examines whiteness as a racialized identity.

== Education ==
Broughel received a BFA from Hunter College in 1999, and an MFA from Hunter College in 2003. She attended the Skowhegan School of Painting and Sculpture in 2008.

== Recognition ==
Broughel has been the recipient of many awards, residencies and grants, including a Create Change Fellowship from the Laundromat Project, a Fellowship in Sculpture from the New York Foundation for the Arts, and an AIR Gallery Fellowship. Her work has been discussed in the New York Times, Hyperallergic, Block Magazine, HYCIDE Magazine, and the PS1 Newspaper, among others.

== Exhibitions ==
Broughel has had solo exhibitions at AIR Gallery, the Aljira Center for Contemporary Art, the Jones Gallery at the University of Memphis, Trailer Park Projects in San Juan, Puerto Rico, and the York Fine Arts Gallery at CUNY. She has been included in group exhibitions at Dorsky Gallery Curatorial Programs, Bronx Art Space, Winkleman Gallery, Rush Arts Gallery, the Caribbean Cultural Center, Duke University, Marlborough Gallery, the Pelham Art Center, MoMA PS1, and the Wallach Art Gallery at Columbia University, among others. She was a participant in the New Museum's 2015 seminar, PERSONA.

== Collectives ==
Broughel is a member of the tART Collective.
