= Broersen and Lukács =

Broersen and Lukács is an artist duo living and working in Amsterdam and is formed by Persijn Broersen (Delft, 1974) and Margit Lukács (Amsterdam, 1973). They have been working together since 2001 making mostly video-art and video-art installations using various mediums such as photography, video and animation. Central to their artworks is the relationship between individuals and their environments, both nature and society, and how this is influenced by the current, media based society. Their works have been part of numerous exhibitions but have also been shown on festivals, for example IFFR and Lowlands festival. Several of their works can also be found in the collection of the Stedelijk Museum Amsterdam and the Akzo Nobel Art Foundation.

They are represented by Akinci, based in Amsterdam.

== Education and residencies ==
Both Broersen and Lukács started their artistic education at the Gerrit Rietveld Academie in Amsterdam, where they studied graphic design from 1994 to 1998. They continued studying Fine Arts and Design at the Sandberg Institute from 1998 to 2001. After residencies at the Chinese European Art Center (Xiamen, China) in 2002 and Iaspis (Stockholm, Sweden) in 2006 they enrolled in a two-year residency at the Rijksakademie in Amsterdam from 2007 to 2008.

They returned to the Chinese European Art Centre in 2010 after which they came back to Europe residing in the Atelier Holsboer (Paris, France) between 2011 and 2012. In 2017, they were residents at the Künstlerhaus Bethanien (Berlin, Germany).

== Selected works ==
=== Crossing the Rainbow Bridge (2003) ===
Crossing the Rainbow Bridge'' is a two-channel video showing two young people who appear to be a couple, played by Broersen and Lukács themselves. The two are shown in separate environments expressing their thoughts, sometimes coming together in song or though. The video was described by Lex ter Braak as "making things visible and tangible" because of the visualization of connections that seem incomprehensible. The sentimental feel of the video is enhanced by the accompanying music by indie-pop band Bauer.

=== The Broersen Family (2006) and Raise High the Roof Beam (2007) ===
For these video's Broersen and Lukács delved into their own family's history. They can be displayed separately or as a combined installation. The Broersen Family is set in the small town of Nieuw Niedorp, where Pepijn Broersen is originally from, and shows the lives of the Broersen family in a four-channel video. Though fictional, the shots are made to look like documentary footage of a town that is slowly influenced by consequences of globalization. Complementing but also responding to this is the work Raise High the Roof Beam, focused around the Jewish-Hungarian roots of Margit Lukács' family. Contrary to the story of Broersen, her family has spread around the world, having no clear origins. With these works, they question to what extent identities are formed by previous generations and family history.

=== Manifest Destiny (2008/2009) ===
Manifest Destiny was made during Broersen and Lukács' final year at the Rijksakademie and tells the story of a scientist on the lookout for life on other planets. The video shows the barren landscape of an imaginary planet while hearing the scientist speak about his ongoing investigations. Slowly, it becomes clear that the scientist is a somewhat lonely soul, in need of social contact in his direct environment while at the same time longing for the unknown world on other planets. The story is based on interviews conducted by Broersen and Lukács with researchers and scholars on the topic of extraterrestrial space. The shots used in the video are inspired by the representation of space in both documentaries and science-fiction, showing "the proximity of reality and fiction that are inevitably found when the explorer is led by a longing for a new reality".

=== Mastering Bambi (2010) ===
Instead of a human or animal as protagonist, nature plays the leading role in Mastering Bambi. Broersen and Lukács built on the idea that the Disney film Bambi can also be interpreted as a metaphor for human society as the sole thread of nature. The spectator is taken through scenes of an empty forest that the artist have created by layering real photographs. Because of the movement and focus of the 'camera' the work has been interpreted as being intimate and private. The video is accompanied by a soundtrack created by Berend Dubbe and Gwendolyn Thomas, who have distorted the original movie soundtrack.

=== Ruins in Reverse (2014) ===
Ruins in Reverse is a 56 meter print made for the escalator area at the Stedelijk Museum Amsterdam and was part of the exhibition 'On the Move'. When standing on the escalator, the visitor is transported past a landscape full of buildings and cities. The image was built up using different scenes from sci-fi movies that depict the future. By exploring these past depictions of the future, the artists wanted to show how the idea of the future in popular media can change with time and can be linked to certain ideologies. The soundtrack was made by Natalia Domínguez Rangel.

=== Establishing Eden (2016) ===
Set to a soundtrack by Berend Dubbe and Gwendolyn Thomas, the single-channel video Establishing Eden is based around the so-called 'establishing shot' used to set a scene in movies. The video is made by layering photographs, the same technique as used to make Mastering Bambi, creating scenes that can be seen as a whole or, when the 'camera' moves, are split apart. The photographs in the video are of the landscapes used as filming locations for The Lord of the Rings series in New-Zealand. With these shots, Broersen and Lukács want to show how nature can inspire movies, but also how these movies in return have changed the way the landscapes are viewed (for example the renaming of various sites).

=== Forest on Location (2018) ===
Broersen and Lukács continue using their layered photographs to form the video Forest on Location, this time introducing an animated figure to the scenes. The scenes are made using 3D-photo's from the old growth forest of Białowieża in Poland. A slight difference in technique causes the photo's to produce 3D scenes of the forest that aren't screen filling but rather appear to be floating in space. An animated avatar of the Iranian opera singer Shahram Yazdani can be seen walking through the woods, singing a Persian version of Nat King Cole's Nature Boy. The song is chosen because of its relation to Herman Yablokoff, a songwriter who claims to have written it and lived close to the forest. The work was part of a three piece installation called 'Point Cloud Old Growth' in foam Amsterdam and was described by curator Mirjam Kooiman as follows: "Broersen and Lukács take nature as a phenomenon from which mankind is perhaps more alienated than anything else today, and investigate the visual framework that we repeatedly project onto it as a means to capture it, to give it meaning, or as a vain attempt to understand it.".

== Solo exhibitions ==
Solo:

- Beautiful Country (2003) - Zuidas, Amsterdam
- Crossing the Rainbow Bridge (2004) - CEAC, Xiamen
- Zwart Licht (2004) - Nieuwe Vide, Haarlem
- Prime Time Paradise (2005) - Verkligheten Gallery, Umea
- Post Horizon (2007) - Stedelijk Museum 's-Hertogenbosch, 's Hertogenbosch
- Manifest Destiny (2009) - ArtAmsterdam, Gallery Akinci, Amsterdam
- Heart is where the Home is (2009) - The Old Stone House, Brooklyn, New York
- The New Sorrows of the Young Werther (2010) - CEAC, Xiamen
- Places We Know (2010) - Akinci, Amsterdam
- News from Nowhere (2012) - Art Cologne, New Propositions, Cologne
- Mastering Bambi (2013) - AkBank, Istanbul Contemporary, Istanbul
- Beyond Sunset and Sunrise (2014) - GL Strand, Copenhagen
- Liquid Territories (2014) - Higgs Field Contemporary Art Space, Budapest
- Darkroom (2015) - Turku Art Museum, Turku
- Relics of the Real (2016) - Akinci, Amsterdam
- Establishing Eden (2017) - Schunck, Heerlen
- Point Cloud, Old Growth (2018) - Foam Amsterdam, Amsterdam
- All or Nothing At All (2019) - Viborg Kunsthal, Viborg
