= TART Collective =

2004–2020 art group

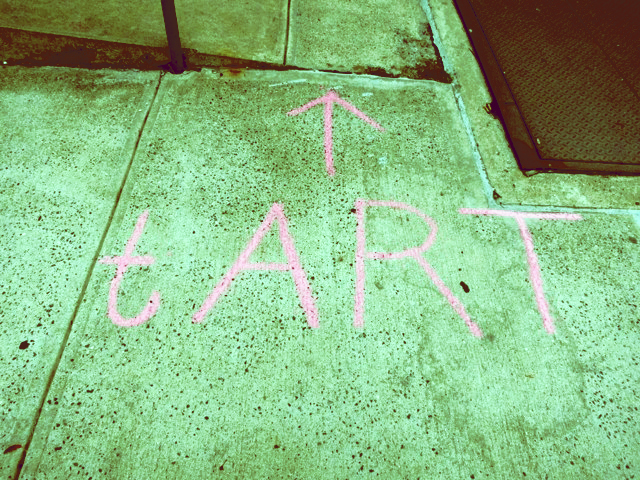
Quick & Dirty exhibition, 2013

The tART Collective was an intersectional feminist and anti-racist art collective in New York City. Founded in 2004 and was running until January 2020 when the group announced its decision to end tART Collective, the group was the longest-running feminist art collective in the city. This group was created to help show support towards feminist content artists. During the years that tART was active, membership rose to two dozen members locally and internationally, and the collective served as a post-graduate plan for artists.

== Feminist Art Group ==
The idea behind tART Collective was running a support group for artists who contribute to bring awareness of feminist and anti-racist ideas through the work of art. tART Collective contributed to different exhibits and events to reach their goal. Members of tART Collective held personal studio visits for all the other members and used this opportunity to get reliable feedback from other artists. There are artists, that contributed towards this group, whose art work still revolves around these ideas.

== Exhibits ==
tART Collective held many art exhibits in the past and had become an official source to show feminist work of art. tART Collective started a project to exhibit art works from members in a project called "Collectively Assembled: 28 Visits, One Show." During this project, artists were encouraged to attend studio visits in which these artists are able to select a work from the studio visit and select their own piece that they believe responded to the selected work from the studio visit. After doing studio visits, members of tART Collective then interpreted what the artist felt and responded to the other member's work.

In 2005, tART organized the first exhibition of the group's artists' work titled "Fed Up With Being Sweet" in a Bowery loft space. In 2016, tART completed a collaboration with Smoke School of Art (SSA) in Atlanta, GA, at WonderRoot, "A Bad Question", an exhibition and forum on race and feminism. This exhibit that was presented in Atlanta was inspired by the article, "How Can White Women Include Women of Color In Feminism?" Is A Bad Question. Here's Why," where members of tART Collective included pieces that helped dismantle white supremacy. In a Burnaway review, Catherine Rush wrote: “'A Bad Question' prioritizes conversations about race and gender in artworks that reference broken and unexamined dominant social systems, their disastrous effects on individual and communal psyches, and the existence and evolution of different voices and modes of being...Not all artists included in this exhibition necessarily consider their work “feminist,” yet the shared goal of tART and SSA to provide support for women artists is an unequivocally feminist objective."

== Other events ==
tART exhibited in NYC, Atlanta, and Prague and combined exhibitions with both actions and public programming. tART artists organized a reading and discussion of the Immigrant Manifesto and collaborated with Create Collective at the Center for Anti-Violence Education on a multi-arts workshop in response to a homophobic rise in street harassment in Brooklyn's Park Slope.

== Artists ==
Artists who contributed to the collective throughout the years:

- Damali Abrams
- Liz Ainslie
- Keliy Anderson-Staley
- Jill Auckenthaler
- Julia Whitney Barnes
- Suzanne Bennett
- Suzanne Broughel
- Monica Carrier
- Sophia Chai
- Sydney Chastain-Chapman
- Laurie Close
- Aisha Cousins
- Melissa Cowper-Smith
- Ann deVere
- Maria Dumlao
- Purdy Eaton
- Laura Fayer
- MaDora Frey
- Georgia Elrod
- Tara Giannini
- Rachael Gorchov
- Clarity Haynes
- Jodie Vincenta Jacobson
- Anna Lise Jensen
- Paddy Johnson
- Elsie Kagan
- Elaine Kaufmann
- Katherine Keltner
- Katy Krantz
- Emily Noelle Lambert
- Katerina Lanfranco
- Rebecca Layton
- Lisa Lindgren
- Rebecca Loyche
- Jodie Lyn-Kee-Chow
- Sandra Mack-Valencia
- Suzanne Malitz
- Glendalys Medina
- Jessica Mein
- Ilse Murdock
- Danielle Mysliwiec
- Katherine Newbegin
- Deborah Pohl
- Anne Polashenski
- Asya Reznikov
- Carrie Rubinstein
- Nikki Schiro
- Amy Shapiro
- Yasmin Spiro
- Melissa Staiger
- Rosemary Taylor
- Petra Gupta Valentova
- Kathleen Vance and Sam Vernon
