= Katerina Lanfranco =

American painter

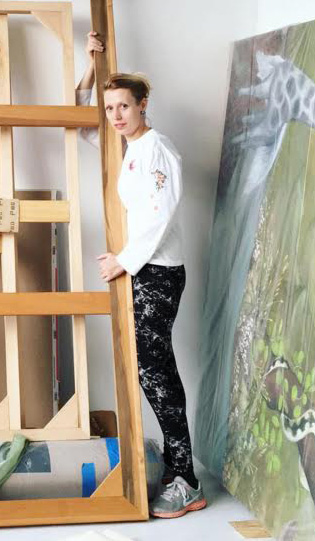
- Born: Katerina Lanfranco; May 8, 1978 (age 48); Hamilton, Ontario, Canada
- Known for: Painting, Sculpture, Installation Art

Katerina Lanfranco (born May 8, 1978) is a New York City-based visual artist making paintings, drawings, sculptures, and mixed media installations. She was born in Hamilton, Ontario. She studied art at the University of California, Santa Cruz where she received her B.A in Visual Art and in "Visual Theory and Museum Studies". She also attended the Sierra Institute studying Nature Philosophies and Religions while camping in the California wilderness. She received her M.F.A from Hunter College, City University of New York in Studio Art, with an emphasis in painting. In 2004, she studied at the Universitat der Kunst (UdK) in Berlin, Germany on an exchange scholarship. During this time, she also received a travel grant to study Baroque and High Baroque painting in Italy.

== Art ==
Lanfranco explores the concepts of nature, science, and fantasy. Her artwork references cultural modes of representing nature to engage in a dialogue between nature and culture, through the medium of visual art. Her work has been compared to Henri Rousseau's subjective and fantastical landscape imagery. Influences include: Albrecht Dürer, Hieronymus Bosch, Baroque Art, Hubble Space Telescope photos, Charles Burchfield, Hudson River School painters, American Museum of Natural History dioramas, Joseph Cornell, Blaschka Glass Flowers, ikebana, katagami, ukiyo prints. "When looking at her artwork, you might not see the subtle relationship between post-Impressionism and expressionism. However, once you start carefully examining it you will discover that Katerina Lanfranco actually uses post-Impressionism as a way to produce a meaningful piece of expressionist type". The New York Times writes: "Katerina Lanfranco’s 'Tomorrow Dreams of Neon' envisions a luminous, post-apocalyptic Eden".

"The results are unlike anything else you'll find in Chelsea just now, and they're beautifully installed in Nancy Hoffman's new space." ARTinfo 1/2009

"Lanfranco's particular vision is compelling..." ARTnews 3/2009

"Ursus Horribilis...recalled works of Henri Rousseau in its use of symbolism and in its boundless imaginativeness." ARTnews 12/06

An image of Ursus Horribilis appeared in the masthead of Time Out New York in March, 2007.

== Career ==
Lanfranco's work is represented by the Nancy Hoffman Gallery, originally located in SoHo and now in the Chelsea Art District, in NYC. Her work is in the permanent collections of the Museum of Modern Art, the Kupferstichkabinett (Museum of Prints and Drawings) in Berlin, Germany, and the Corning Museum of Glass. Lanfranco's work has been shown nationally and internationally. She has had solo exhibitions in California, New York, Toronto, Ontario, Canada, Kyoto, Japan, and Berlin, Germany. Lanfranco is the Founder and Director of Rhombus Space, a contemporary art gallery in the Red Hook neighborhood of Brooklyn, NY. Since its inauguration in September 2013, Rhombus Space has invited artists with exceptional talent and commitment to exhibit their work in the context of their peers. Rhombus Space exhibitions feature curatorial themes that bring together diverse artwork by innovative contemporary artists. Rhombus Space also presents solo exhibitions and art events. From 2015 to 2018, Katerina Lanfranco was the Chief Curator of Trestle Gallery at the Brooklyn Art Space.

== Awards ==
Vermont Studio Center, Art Battle Winner, Japan-United States Creative Exchange Fellowship Artist in Residence. Japan/US Friendship Commission and the National Endowment for the Arts. Pollock Krasner Fellow. Byrdcliffe Artist Residency. EFA Studio Artist is Residence in collaboration with Flux Factory. Tony Smith Award. Hunter College Exchange Scholarship. William Graft Memorial Fund Travel Grant Award. Eduardo Carrillo Painting Scholarship. Susan Benteen and William Hyde Irwin Art Scholarship.

== Solo shows ==
- Efflorescence, SCPS Gallery, Manhattan, NY - 2018

At the Pratt Institute Manhattan Center A large-scale exhibition of paintings, cutouts, and sculptures.

- Mystic Geometry, Nancy Hoffman Gallery, Manhattan, NY - 2017-2018

A large-scale exhibition of paintings, cutouts, and sculptures.

- Mystic Geometry - Circling the Square, Trestle Gallery, Brooklyn, NY - 2017

Immersive site-specific installation that centers itself around an octagonal floor mandala and sculpture situated at the center of the square gallery.

- From New York with Love, Red Head Gallery, Toronto, Ontario, Canada - 2015

Survey of recent work, and large-scale yarn wall drawing.

- Summer Nights, Josti, Berlin, Germany - 2015

Paintings and mixed media works made with wood from Grunewald (forest), Berlin.

- Wildflowers and Floating Worlds, Nancy Hoffman Gallery, NYC - 2013

Mixed media sculptures of fantastical flowers with conjured Latin names, and otherworldly landscapes - using flameworked glass, plaster, paper clay, paint, and sewn elements – presented in shadow box frames.

- Natural Selection, Mary Porter Sesnon Gallery, Santa Cruz, CA - 2012

Site-specific installation of hand-cut black Tyvek depicting native North American and Japanese trees to create a hybrid forest with embedded cultural symbols. Created for the Mary Porter Sesnon Gallery.

- Below a Sea of Stars, Nancy Hoffman Gallery, NYC - 2009

Combining the deep reaches of outer space with the deep sea to create an imagined liminal space of known geography. Conceptually a fertile ground for invented flora and fauna that might inhabit this dark, cold and distant landscape.

- Ursus Horribilis, Nancy Hoffman Gallery, NYC - 2006

Ursus Horribilis is the unfortunate Latin name for Grizzly Bear – an iconic symbol of American wilderness. This diorama made in the traditional museum of natural history style (AMNH) creates a fictitious scene complete with habitat and food sources for this fabricated hybrid bear. The large oil paintings on either side of the bear are artistic depictions of Biblical Creation and Evolutionary Theory.

== Teaching ==
She teaches at the Museum of Modern Art, Hunter College, Parsons, the New School for Design, Fordham University, and Pratt Institute. Lanfranco has taught studio art at LIM College, Rutgers University, Brooklyn Botanic Garden, Brooklyn Art Space, and American Museum of Folk Art.

== Selected bibliography 2012-2014 ==
Cover art and book illustrations for "Wrapped in Red" by Alana I. Capria. October 31, 2014. New York Alumni Artist Returns to Mentor Students. UCSC News. February 28, 2012. Paper Cutout World at Sesnon Gallery. Santa Cruz Weekly, February 14, 2012. Natural Selection, in ARTSEEN, Goodtimes Santa Cruz, January 2012. Seeing the Forest for the Trees. City on a Hill Press, January 31, 2012. Brooklyn Artist Katerina Lanfranco Speaks About Her Panoramic Expressions. Tennessee Journalist, February 18, 2011. Brush with Greatness. Toronto Star, October 11, 2010, p. E1-2. Brush with Art. NOW Magazine, October 14, 2010, p. 12. Katerina Lanfranco, solo show review in ARTnews. March 2009, p. 112-3. New York Gallery Shows to Start 2009, solo exhibition review, ARTinfo, 1/14/09. Ursus Horribilis, solo show reviewed in ARTnews. December 2006, p. 156. Nature and Culture Intersect, reviewed in The Villager, 10/11/01, p. 36. Re-Seen, solo show reviewed in Metro Santa Cruz, 5/9/01, p. 35. Biting Birds and Bees, solo show reviewed in Metro Santa Cruz, 1/31/01, p. 29. Biting Birds and Bees, solo show reviewed, Good Times Santa Cruz, 2/1/01, p. 23 Dis-placements and Anxious Objects, Good Times Santa Cruz, 2/22/01, p. 25.

== See also ==
- tART Artist Collective
