= Hendrik-Jan Grievink =

Dutch graphic designer (born 1977)

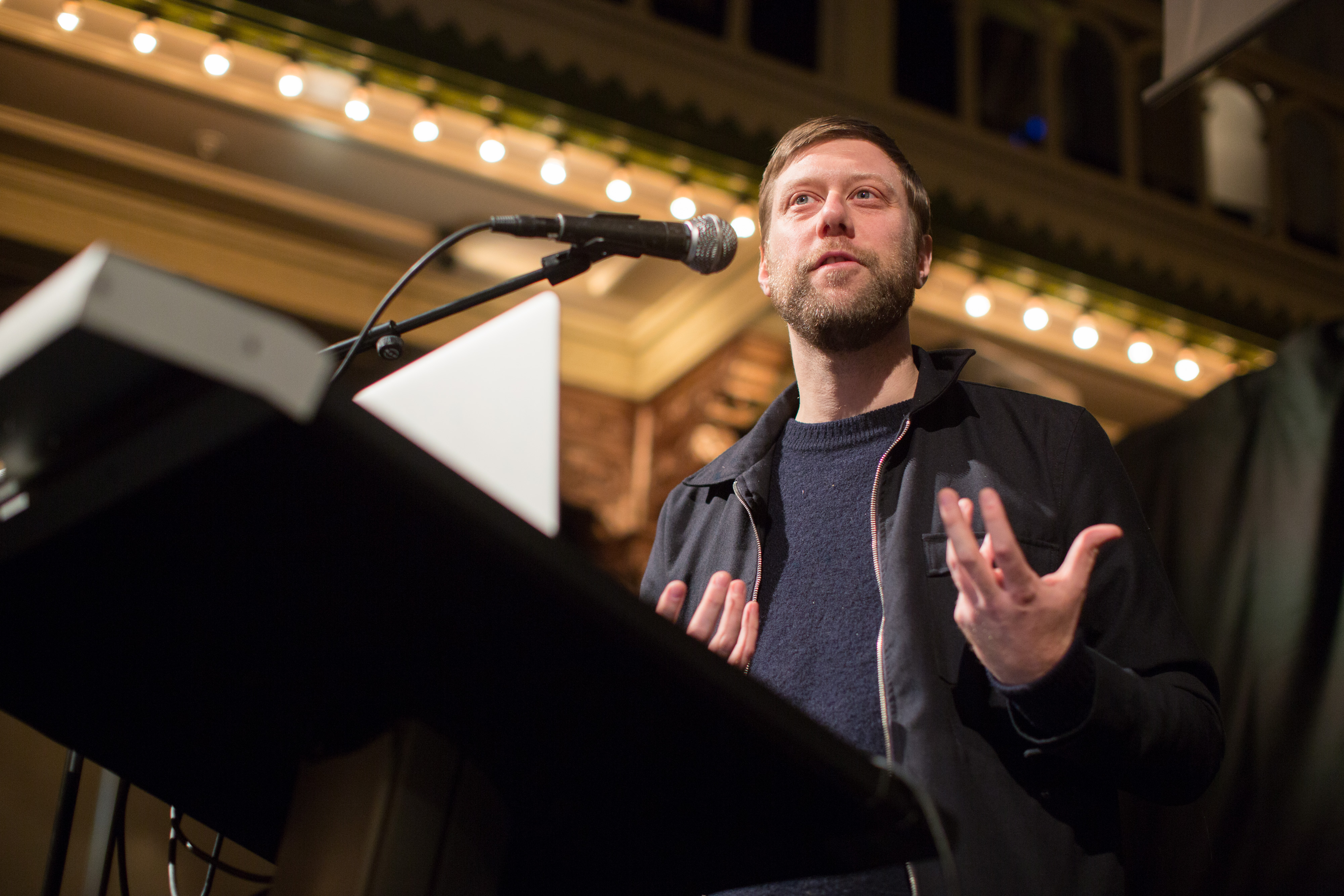
Hendrik Jan Grievink at the Crypto Design Awards 2016

HJ Grievink (born June 14, 1977) is a Dutch graphic designer and editor based in Amsterdam. He works on a range of commissioned and self-initiated projects positioned at the intersection of graphic design and visual culture research. Grievink is best known for designing and co-editing the book Next Nature: Nature Changes Along With Us, and for developing the memory games, Fake for Real and Brand Memory.

== Projects ==
=== Next Nature ===
Grievink is editor and resident designer of the networked think- and design tank Next Nature Network. In 2011 he co-edited the book Next Nature: Nature Changes Along With Us with Koert Van Mensvoort. Scientific American magazine described it as “a beautiful, thoughtful, and thought-provoking collection of images and essays.”

=== Fake for Real ===
Grievink has created memory games for Dutch publishing house BIS. In 2007 he designed Fake for Real, a memory game about reality and simulation in our media society. The game uses historical and contemporary images to playfully visualize the classical theme of fake and real. The game is now in its 6th printing.

=== Brand Memory ===
In 2011 Grievink designed the game Brand Memory which challenges players' ability to recognize major brands through the association of visual cues alone. Brand Memory tests a players' knowledge of commercial branding and confronts the player to recognize icons he knows without even noticing. The memory game was inspired after the regular performances Grievink gives, where he reads aloud descriptions of iconic brands as they are projected on the screen.

=== Wiki Loves Art ===
Grievink has designed several books that reflect on design and visual culture. He conceptualized and designed Wiki Loves Art, a book which documents Wiki Loves Art/NL, a monthlong competition in the Netherlands and a part of the Wikipedia:Wikipedia Loves Art initiative which allowed visitors and photographers to take pictures of artworks usually off limits across 46 Dutch museums. Following the competition, pictures were uploaded to the Wiki Loves Art/NL Flickr group, and have since been added to the Wikimedia Commons archive. Wiki Loves Art includes a collection of photos from the competition, essays and remixes of photographs by artists and designers, amongst them Metahaven and Amie Dicke.

=== Open Design Now ===
Grievink conceptualized and designed Open Design Now: Why Design Cannot Remain Exclusive. The book is a production of Premsela Netherlands Institute for Design and Fashion, Waag Society and Creative Commons Netherlands in association with BIS Publishers about open design.

=== Artificial Womb ===
Starting in 2018 he is currently working with Lisa Mandemaker and Guid Oei of Maxima Medical Centre, to design an artificial womb with the purpose of developing premature childbirths (24–28 months) and increase their survivability.

== Presentations and lectures ==
- 2003 BNO Delta Romeo, Rotterdam
- 2007 Contemporary Undercurrents, Designplatform Rotterdam
- 2007 Museum of Contemporary Design and Applied Arts, Lausanne (Switzerland)
- 2007 Zefir7, The Hague
- 2007 Xiamen University, Xiamen (China)
- 2008 Art Center College of Design, Pasadena, CA (USA)
- 2008 East China Normal University, Shanghai (China)
- 2010 My First Swastika, during The Great Dictators, TrouwAmsterdam
- 2010 Wiki Loves Art, at Critical Point of View Wikipedia conference, Amsterdam
- 2010 Central Academy of Fine Arts (CAFA), Beijing (China)
- 2011 Next Nature Power Show, Stadsschouwburg Amsterdam
- 2011 BNO spellbound, Amsterdam

== Academic ==
Grievink received his bachelor's degree in Graphic Design from ArtEZ Hogeschool voor de Kunsten (1994-1999). He holds a Master's in Design from Sandberg Institute (2005-2007), the postgraduate course of the Gerrit Rietveld Academie in Amsterdam.

== Bibliography ==
Hendrik-Jan Grievink writes articles, creates games, and co-authored a book.

- I Read Where I Am
- Brand Memory
- Fake for Real
- Next Nature: Nature Changes Along With Us
- Open Design Now
- Style First
- Wiki Loves Art
- The In Vitro Meat Cookbook
