= Paddy Johnson =

American art critic

Paddy Johnson is a New York-based art educator and entrepreneur. She is the Founder and CEO of VVrkshop LLC, a company that includes running the artist membership Netvvrk, founded in 2021. Her background includes art criticism, blogging, curation and writing for various publications. Johnson was the founder and editor of the art blog Art F City (formerly called Art Fag City) which was last updated in 2021. Art F City published a calendar in 2015 titled "Nude Artists as Pandas," featuring naked artists dressed up in panda costumes.

== Early life ==
Johnson was born in Guelph, Ontario. She was educated at Mount Allison University in Sackville, New Brunswick, and continued her education at Rutgers University. She has slowly gained notoriety as an art critic in the New York art scene. She is also known for her live coverage of major art fairs such as the Armory Show, Venice Biennale, Frieze Art Fair, and Art Basel in Miami and Switzerland.

== Career ==
=== Coaching Artists ===
Johnson created Netvvrk to support mid-career artists. Netvvrk includes a membership portal that allows artists to communicate with a community of peers, access a curriculum addressing the needs of creative small business owners, receive online artist mentoring, participate in workshops, connect with prominent arts professionals, and engage in critical art review. Johnson found that creating and running a platform for artists to connect directly was more effective in helping greater numbers of artists build their careers than by doing piecemeal, teaching. Netvvrk has helped artists get more than 1M in grants in the first two years of its existence.

=== Teaching ===
Johnson got her start teaching in the NYU Cinema Studies Department.

=== Publishing ===
She penned a regular column for L Magazine in New York. Her work has appeared in numerous publications, including ArtReview, Art & Australia, Art in America, Artkrush, The Daily Beast, FlashArt, Flavorpill, The Guardian, The Huffington Post, Hyperallergic, More Intelligent Life, New York Press, NYFA Current, Print (magazine), The Reeler, Time Out NY.

She attended the 2007 iCommons conference in Croatia as a blogger. In 2008, she served on the board of the Rockefeller Foundation New Media Fellowships and became the first blogger to earn a Creative Capital Arts Writers grant from the Creative Capital Foundation which is part of the Andy Warhol Foundation. She has also served on a panel for ArtPrize.

She contributed to Paper Monument's first book, I Like Your Work: Art and Etiquette.

In December, 2011, Johnson was named in a federal libel lawsuit in United States district court for a May, 2011 article she published in Art Fag City, which suggested an art restorer was a forger and committed crimes.

=== Sound of Art ===
In November 2010 Johnson released an LP called "Now That's What You Call Net Art", a DJ battle record that compiles mixes based from sounds recorded in art spaces, galleries, and museums in Manhattan and Brooklyn, pitting the neighboring boroughs against each other. Johnson raised over $11,000 with a Kickstarter campaign to fund the project, calling upon sound art lovers and a cadre of collectors to pre-purchase the album. Johnson predicted the project would spawn follow-up records, including East Coast vs. West Coast, and Canada vs. USA. Johnson told WNYC's Carolina Miranda that the Brooklyn recordings sound more DIY.

Podcast

Johnson is the host and founder of the popular podcast "Art Problems," for artists who want shows, grants, and residencies, since 2022.

== See also ==
- tART Artist Collective
