= Floris Kaayk =

Dutch digital artist

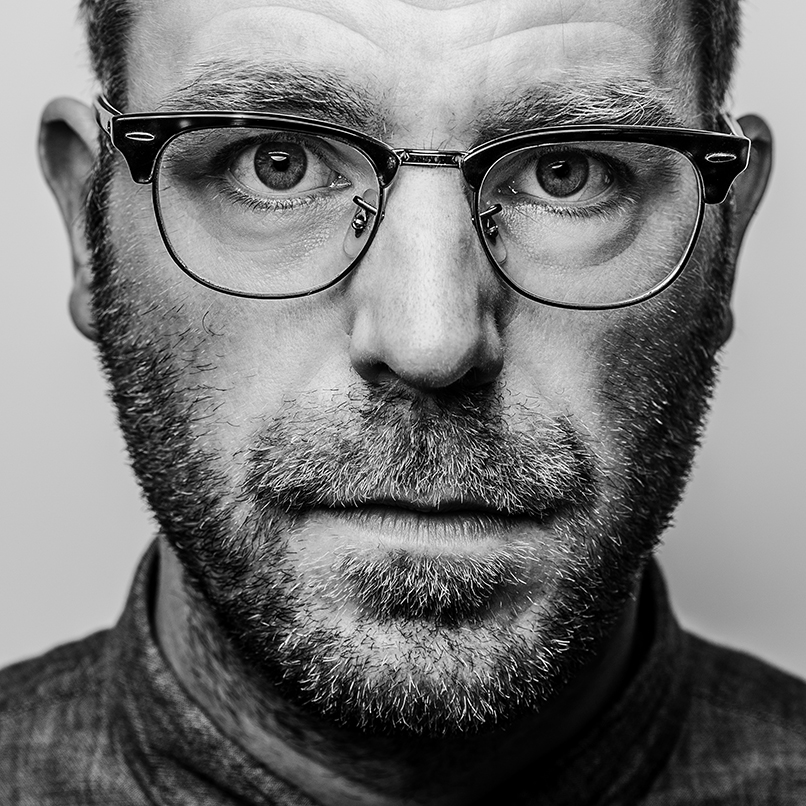
- Born: 1982 (age 43–44); Tiel, Netherlands
- Occupation: Digital artist

Floris Kaayk (born 1982) is a Dutch digital artist. He grew up in Tiel as the son of the artist couple, Coen and Guusje Kaayk. Kaayk graduated summa cum laude from the animation department of AKV St. Joost academy of Art and Design in Breda, and gained a Master of Fine Arts degree from the Sandberg Institute in Amsterdam. His work focuses on futuristic concepts and fantasies, and visualises technological progress, sometimes by demonstrating its advantages and at other times by presenting negative consequences.

Kaayk first became known to a wider audience with his fictional ‘semidocumentaries’ The Order Electrus and Metalosis Maligna. His animated films have received several international awards. In 2011, The Origin of Creatures was selected as the Dutch entry for the Academy Awards in the Best Animated Short Film category. In that same year, Kaayk made headlines with a number of social media videos posted on the weblog of his alter ego, Jarno Smeets, who claimed to be the first human able to ‘fly like a bird’. International television stations used the images in their news programme. In March 2012, Kaayk revealed on the popular Dutch TV show De Wereld Draait Door that it was all fiction: Jarno’s story was an art project undertaken in collaboration with production company Revolver Media and public-service broadcaster NTR.

Another project was Rayfish Footwear (2012), a fictitious company and web shop that invited people to ‘grow’ their own personalised sneakers using genetically modified stingray leather. A carefully prepared narrative was distributed via various media platforms, where it proved sufficiently credible for a loyal group of followers, who were eventually disappointed when the truth was revealed.

The experimental online project The Modular Body (2016) visualises a future where a prototype of the human body has been designed and created using 3D printing and cell culture technologies. The videos featuring the central character ‘Oscar’ – a prototype ‘Modular Man’ made up of various self-assembly modules – are frighteningly realistic. In this project, Kaayk was clear about the fictitious nature of the images from the start while leaving room for viewers’ own interpretations and beliefs.

In 2017, Kaayk started working on the game Next Space Rebels. The game started as a speculative art project that grew to become a commercial product. The project has been supported through the Dutch Digital Culture Grant Scheme, part of the Dutch Stimuleringsfonds. Next Space Rebels has been published by Humble Games in 2021 and made available on a wide variety of gaming platforms.

== Awards ==
In 2014, Kaayk won the de Volkskrant Visual Arts Prize for his animated films and semidocumentaries. In 2016, his video for the song Witch Doctor by Dutch alternative rock band De Staat received numerous prizes, including a UK Music Video Award, an Edison Award, and a European Music Video Award. In 2016, The Modular Body won a Golden Calf Award at the Netherlands Film Festival in the ‘Best Interactive Work’ category. In 2017 Kaayk received the Witteveen+Bos award for Art+Technology for his complete oeuvre. In 2012 he was named Creative City Ambassador by the City of The Hague, and in 2016 he was appointed Fellow of HKU University of the Arts Utrecht and Fellow of Next Nature Network.
