= Margi Geerlinks =

Dutch photographer (born 1970)

Margi Geerlinks.
- Margi Geerlinks at her Gallery 158 in Schiedam with expo of work of George Belzer in 2026
- Born: 1970 (age 55–56); Rotterdam, Netherlands
- Education: Gerrit Rietveld Academy ; Art Academy Constantyn Huygens ; Sandberg Institute
- Known for: Photography ; gallerist
- Notable work: Untitled ; Eve II ; Living Dolls

Margi Geerlinks (born 1970) is a Dutch photographer.

Born in Kampen, Overijssel, Geerlinks lives and works in Rotterdam. She graduated from the Rietveld Academy in 1991, the Art Academy Constantyn Huygens in 1995, and the Masters Program at the Sandberg Institute in 1997. Her work is described as being "concerned with the ways the human species creates an identity for themselves, and the forces that seem to govern this process", and she digitally manipulates her photographs to achieve the desired effect.

A 1999 work by Geerlinks, Untitled, is owned by the Mint Museum. Her photograph Eve II was donated to the National Museum of Women in the Arts by Heather and Tony Podesta. The museum also owns the 2001 work Living Dolls, which was formerly in the collection of the Corcoran Gallery of Art.
