= MMX Open Art Venue =

- Established: 2010
- Location: Linienstraße 142, Berlin, Germany
- Director: Rebecca Loyche; Jonathan Loyche (Gröger)
- Website: www.mmx.mx

MMX Open Art Venue was an art gallery in Berlin, founded in 2010 as a one-year art experiment and reincarnated as re:MMX in 2012. The MMX project, which included the works of more than 200 international artists, was noted as the revival of the concept of artist collectives in Berlin.

== History ==
The project for the gallery started in October 2009, after three months of renovations of 1000 square meters in a formerly squatted and abandoned building in Linienstraße, in the heart of the commercial art district of Berlin's Mitte. The building's new owners wanted to use it for something innovative during one year while they were sorting out the paperwork. MMX Open Art Venue officially started on New Year 2010.

The founders of MMX were artists Rebecca Loyche and Jonathan Gröger. They curated and directed the gallery for a year, using the space for alternative ways to show international art. During that time, more than 200 international artists exhibited on the ground floor of the building. The final exhibition, Show VII, opened in October 2010. It gathered artists from all over the world, and each artist took a room, moulded it, and presented artwork that embodied the theme "the end is just the beginning."

When MMX closed its doors in 2011, the building became the venue for undercover street artists in a project that became known as "The Cave." Meanwhile, the gallery founders opened a new art space, called Co-Verlag, in April 2012.

However, the developers who bought the MMX site invited the founders back, so they started re:MMX, a gallery curating large-scale public art, in September 2012. Re:MMX reinstalled some old popular works from MMX, kept the street art from The Cave project, and added new panoramic video works, photography and painting. Using the fact that the place was a construction site, the artists explored the idea of transformation. Re:MMX ended in March 2013.

== Aftermath ==
MMX was described as a project that "channeled the spirit of the early years after the Berlin Wall fell" and "reinvigorated the concept of artist collectives in Berlin."

The whole project was documented in a book, MMX Open Art Venue - One Year One Book, which was published in 2011 after a successful Kickstarter drive.
