= Dafna Kaffeman =

Israeli artist

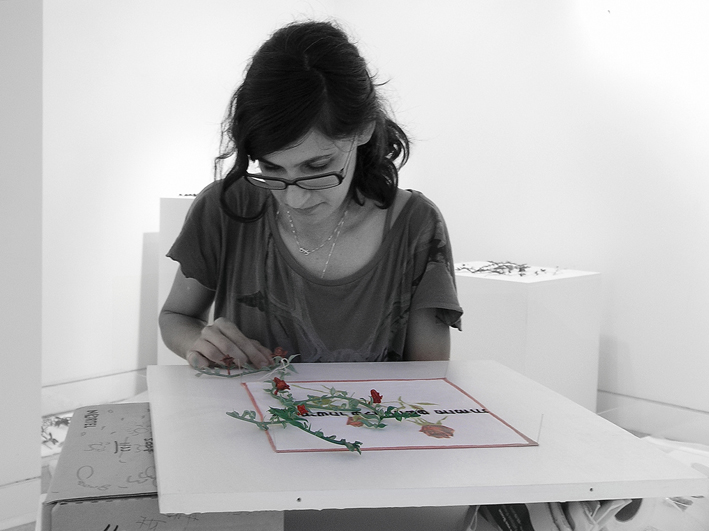
Dafna Kaffeman

Dafna Kaffeman (born in Jerusalem) is an artist and a senior lecturer at the Bezalel Academy of Arts and Design. She works with glass and various materials and techniques such as embroidery, print, drawing, to produce what the David Owsley Museum of Art describes as "beautiful, crafted surfaces and disturbing text about aggressors and victims". She lives and works in Israel. Her work has appeared in solo and group exhibitions, and she has won, or been nominated for, a number of international prizes and awards.

== Biography ==
Dafna Kaffeman graduated in 1999 from the Gerrit Rietveld Academy in Amsterdam, and in 2001 received a Master of Fine Arts from the Sandberg Institute, also in Amsterdam. She had one-person shows, among others, at the Chrysler Museum of Art (2012), San Francisco Museum of Craft and Design (2015–16); the David Owsley Museum of Art at Ball State University in Muncie, Indiana, (2014–15); the American University Museum in Washington, D.C. (2011); and the lorch + seidel contemporary in Berlin, Germany (2006, 2010, 2013, 2017). She has participated in many group shows in Europe and the United States. In 2019 she won the Andree Matter Award for a woman artist by MADREEMA foundation. She won the Design Prize from the Israel culture ministry in 2016 and was awarded the Prize for the Advancement of the Arts (Israel) in 2011.

Kaffeman's works are exhibited in the collections of various museums such as the Israel Museum in Jerusalem, IL, the Montreal Museum of Contemporary Art in Montreal, Canada, the Victoria and Albert Museum, in London, England, the Corning Museum of Glass, in Corning, N.Y,Coburg Museum, Germany and more. She is senior lecturer, and was head of the glass course, at the Bezalel Academy of Arts and Design in Jerusalem between 2005 and 2011.

Kaffeman taught in various institutes such as the Tokyo Art University, Japan, Ball State University in Indiana, USA, Massachusetts Collage of Arts, Boston, USA, Kublenz University, Germany, Corning Museum of Glass, NY, USA. She had lectured at the Natural History Museum in TA, IL, The Gerrit Rietveld Academy, Amsterdam, NL, The Royal College of Arts, London, England.

== Working methods ==
Described as "a poetess in glass," Kaffeman's work deals with social and political processes in Israel using several layers—texts that refer to events in the country and images of local flora and fauna—through which she addresses themes such as identity and immigration.

Using lamp working techniques, she has been building a botanical collection made of glass. Each work, whether of plants or insects, is informed by personal observation of the local environment through a cultural and an iconographic interpretation. In recent years, research processes, including drawing on paper, have become an integral part of her exhibitions. Embroidery plays a significant role in the work, serving as a platform for the text on which the work is based, and enabling collaboration with a varied range of populations.

The catalogue of the winners of the 2011 Israeli Minister of Culture prizes describes Kaffeman's work as: "Using a botanic lexicon that reaches into cultural practices of commemoration, sacrifice and mourning, the artist blends local values in meticulously crafted glass and embroidery work."

Davira Taraqin writes of her work:

Since 2002, Kaffeman's increasingly transparent statements, first on politics and now on social issues, have taken two distinct directions. The plant and animal forms that comprise such series as 'Tactual Stimulation' and 'Wolves' are fabricated primarily from flame-worked glass. Kaffeman maintains that her subjects provided her a means to explore human behavior; but even early on her references to nature—a recurring metaphor used by many young Israeli artists—demonstrate her deep kinship with her homeland...Since 2006, Kaffeman has also made mini-environments that consist of embroidered handkerchiefs or felt to which she affixes flame-worked glass plants, sometimes insects...These carefully considered micro-environments present the disparity between beautiful crafted surfaces and disturbing text about aggressors and victims. (From the catalogue Without Camouflage. Dafna Kaffeman. Silvia Levenson, published by the David Owsley Museum of Art, Indiana, April 2014)

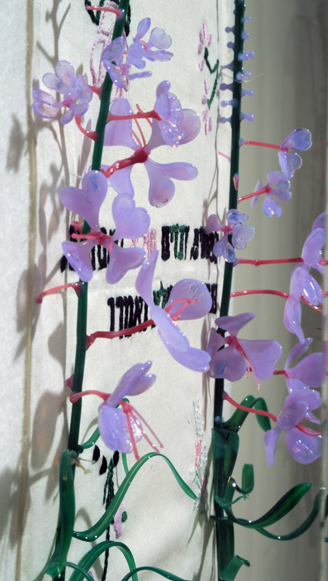
Detail, Glass

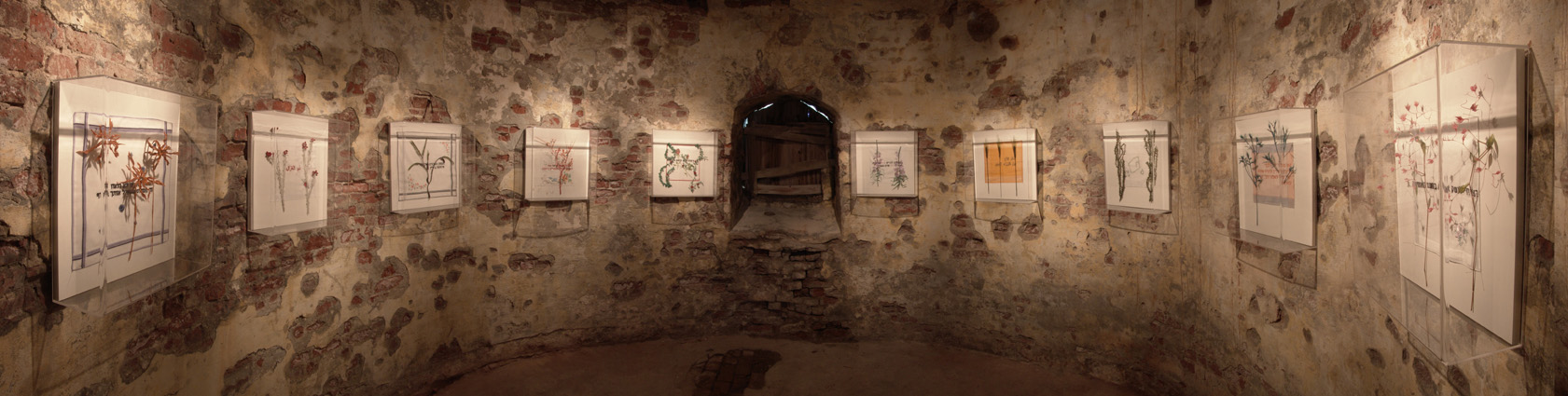
Panoramic view of the exhibition Red Everlasting, Norway

== Exhibitions ==
=== Solo exhibitions ===
- anywhere, nowhere, elsewhere, Inga Gallery, Tel Aviv, IL, Sep-Oct,2024
- the fire age, Traver Gallery, Seattle, USA, July,2024
- Aerial Roots, Petach Tikva Museum of Art, Israel, Curator Irena Gordon, Aug – Dec 2021
- if you thirst for a homeland, Chrysler Museum of Art, Norfolk, Virginia, Curators Carolyn Swan Needell & Trudy Wiesenberger, Aug – Dec 2021, Roe Green Gallery at the Jewish Federation of Cleveland, April 2021
- cotton plant, lorch+seidel contemporary, Berlin, Germany, September - November 2017
- Without Camouflage, Museum of Craft and Design San Francisco, CA, USA, Curator Davira Taragin, September 2015 – March 2016
- David Owsley Museum of Art, IN, USA, Curator Davira Taragin, April–August 2014
- Eretz Israel Museum, Ramat Aviv, Israel, Curator Henrietta Eliezer Brunner, 2013
- Invasive Plants, lorch+seidel contemporary, Berlin, Germany, 2013
- Invasive Plants, Keramikmuseum Westerwarld, Höhr-Grenzhausen, Germany, Curator Prof. Jens Gussek, 2013
- What Could Be Better Than Going to Paradise?, American University Museum, Washington DC, USA, Curator Jack Rasmussen, 2011
- Mantis Religiosa, lorch+seidel contemporary, Berlin, Germany, 2010
- Red Everlasting, Utsira Lighthouse, Stavanger, European Capital of Culture, Norway, 2008
- Persian Cyclamen, lorch+seidel contemporary, Berlin, Germany, 2006
- I Was Trained Hunting Wolves, Heller Gallery, New York, USA, 2004
- Special exhibit, Eretz Israel Museum, Ramat Aviv, Israel, Curator Henrietta Eliezer Brunner, 2002

=== Selected group exhibitions ===
- Toyama Museum of Art Glass, Japan, 2024
- The Geological Museum, Ramat Hasharon, IL, curators Rachel Saspporta and Ronit Zor, 2023–2024
- Eretz Israel Museum, TA, IL, Curator Henrietta Eliezer Brunner, 2023–2024
- Israel Museum, Jerusalem, IL, curator Talia Amar, 2022–2023
- Eretz Israel Museum, TA, IL, Curator Henrietta Eliezer Brunner & Yuval Saar, 2019–2021
- Corning Museum of Glass, NY, USA, Curator Susie J Silbert, 2019–2020
- Israel Museum Ticho House, Jerusalem, IL, Curator Tami Manor-Freidman, 2019
- Jerusalem Print Workshop, Jerusalem, IL, Curator Irena Gordon, 2019
- Stephen D. Paine Galleries, Massachusetts College of Art and Design, Boston, USA, curator Lisa Tung, 2017
- Glasmuseum Alter Hof Herding, Ernsting Stiftung, Germany, curators Lilly Ernsting and Dr. Ulrike Hoppe-Oehl, 2017
- Two Artists Show, lorch + seidel contemporary, Berlin, 2016
- lorch + seidel contemporary, Berlin, 2015
- Alexander Tutsek-Stiftung, Germany, Curator Prof. Dr. Florian Hufnagl, 2013
- Culture Ministry Prizes 2011, Petach Tikva Museum, Israel, Curator Naomi Aviv, 2012
- lorch + seidel contemporary, Berlin, 2012
- The Montreal Museum of Fine Arts, Montreal, Canada, Curator Diane Charbonneau, 2010
- Glas-Museum Alter Hof Herding, Ernsting Stiftung, Germany, curator Dr. Ulrike Hoppe-Oehl, 2010
- lorch + seidel contemporary, Berlin, 2010
- Gemeenteuseum, The Netherlands, Curators Caroline Prisse and titus M. Eliansse, 2009
- Virginia Museum of Contemporary Art, VA, USA, 2009
- lorch + seidel contemporary, Berlin, 2009 – 2010
- lorch + seidel contemporary, 2008
- MAD Museum, New York, USA Curator David Macfadden, 2007
- Eretz Israel Museum, Ramat Aviv, Israel, Curator Enrietta Eliezer Brunner, 2007
- lorch + seidel contemporary, 2006 – 2007
- Racine Art Museum, Racine, WI, USA, 2005
- Museum Jan van der Togt, Amsterlveen, NL, 2002

== Works in collections ==
- The Israel Museum. Jerusalem, Israel.
- The Montreal Museum of Fine Arts. Montreal, Canada.
- Corning Museum of Glass, Corning, NY, USA.
- David Owsley Museum of Art, Muncie, IN, USA
- Museum of American Glass, Millville, NJ, USA.
- Racine Art Museum, Racine, WI, USA.
- Glasmuseum Alter Hof Herding, Ernsting Stiftung, Coesfeld-Lette, Germany.
- Victoria & Albert Museum, London, England.
- Museum of Modern Glass, Kunstsammlungen der Veste Coburg, Coburg, Germany.
- Alexander Tutsek-Stiftung, Germany.
- Musée Centre d'Art du Verre, Carmaux, Tarn, France.

== Prizes ==
- 2019: Andree Matter Award for a woman Artist, MADREEMA Foundation
- 2016: Prize for creation in the field of Design, Ministry of Culture, Israel.
- 2011: Prize for the Advancement of the Arts, Ministry of Culture, Israel.
- 2007: Finalist, Bombay Sapphire Prize, UK
- 2005–2006: Award by the Hilbert Sosin Fund of the Florida Glass Art Alliance.
- 2004: Honoree Diploma, Jutta-Cuny-Franz Memorial Award, Jutta-Cuny-Franz Foundation, Germany.
- 2002: Nomination, Bernadine de Neeveprijs, the Netherlands
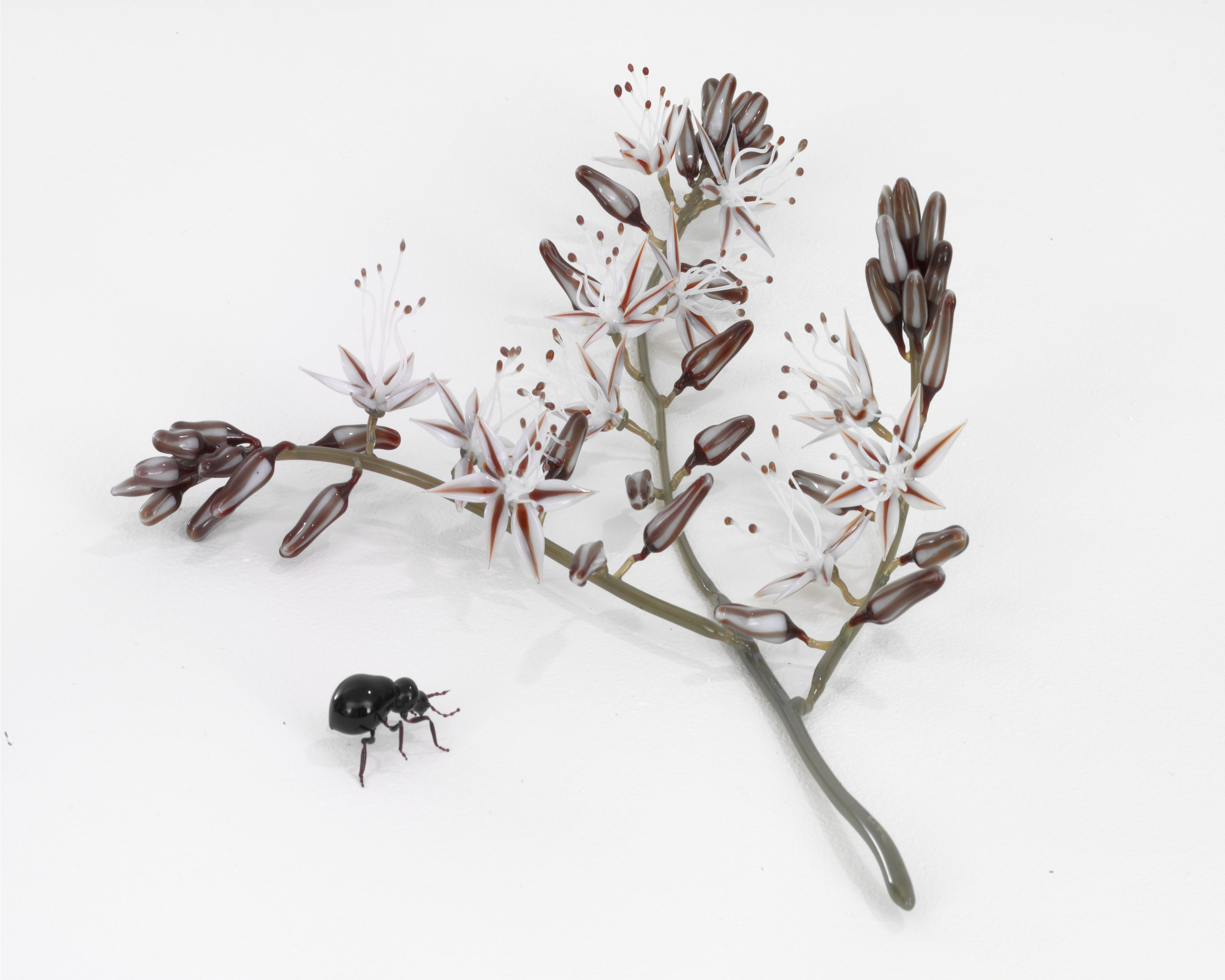
Detail, Glass

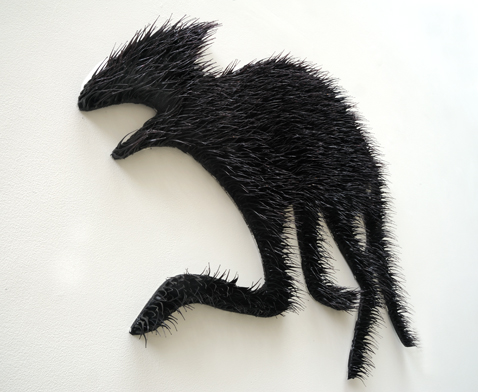
Wolf, glass, from the series Hunters and Hunted

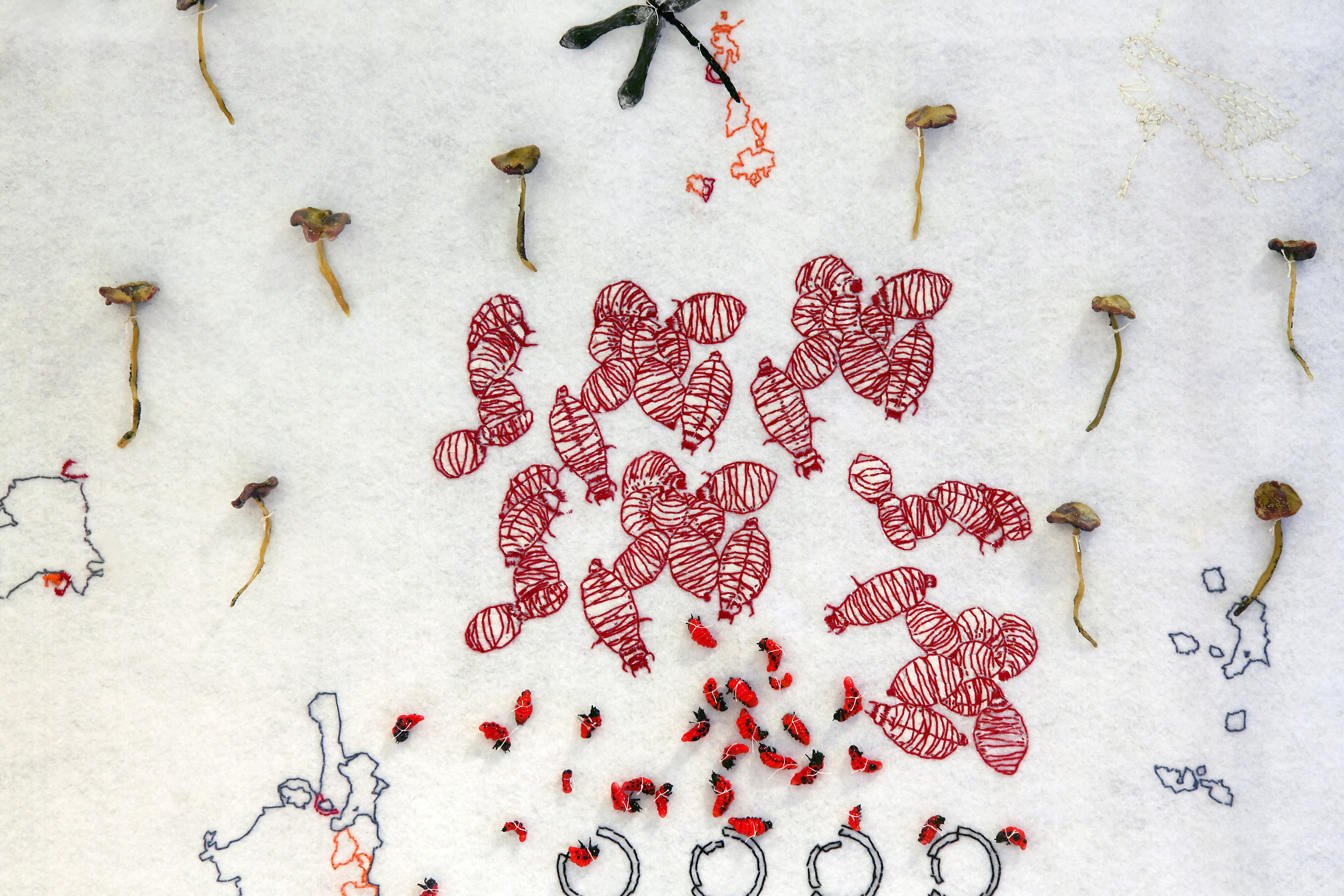
Invasive Plants, Glass, Embroidery
