= Lisa Mandemaker =

Dutch designer

- Citizenship: Netherlands
- Occupation: Social Designer

Lisa Mandemaker is a Dutch designer of a prototype artificial womb for extremely premature babies, and has been included in the BBC's list of 100 inspiring and influential women from around the world for 2019.

== Life ==
Living in Amsterdam, Mandemaker has a master's degree in Design Products from the Royal College of Art in London.

== Work ==
Started in 2018, the artificial womb Lisa Mandemaker, Guid Oei of Maxima Medical Centre, and Hendrik-Jan Grievink are currently developing contains a liquid environment to develop premature childbirths (24–28 weeks) and increase survivability. The environment allows vital oxygen and nutrients to pass through the umbilical cord, and has been proposed as an alternative to an incubation which has higher risks due to the oxygen environment. The project has funding of €2.9 million, and a completion goal of five to ten years. Concerns of the project include unknown short term and long-term impacts on the child.

Past work also includes workshops and projects on the state of unsettlement of Brexit and other social commentaries on the modern day. She has been featured in the 2014 Seoul Design Festival.
