= Rebecca Loyche =

American artist and curator (born 1979)

- Born: 1979 (age 46–47)
- Education: Pratt Institute; Hunter College
- Known for: Video; Photography; Sound; Installation
- Website: www.rebeccaloyche.com

Rebecca Loyche (born 1979) is an American artist and curator. Based in Berlin and New York City, she works with a variety of mediums including video, photography, sound, and installation. Her work focuses on perception and communication. Loyche has curated programs throughout the United States, China and Europe.

== Early life and education ==
Loyche grew up on horse farms in Upstate New York and moved to New York City in 1997. She received her Bachelors of Fine Art at Pratt Institute in Sculpture in 2001 and her Masters of Fine Art in Combined Media at Hunter College in 2006. She was accepted into the 2008 Bronx Museum Artist in the Marketplace program. From 2007 to 2009 she was an active member in the feminist artist collective tART in New York City. In 2009 Loyche moved to Berlin after being accepted into the Meisterschuler programme on a DAAD scholarship at Braunschweig University of Art, where she was a master-class student of Candice Breitz in 2011.

== Career ==
At the exhibition entitled "Love / War / Sex" in the New York gallery Exit Art in 2007, Loyche presented All's fair in love and war, a three-channel video installation where a weapons specialist demonstrates, with professional detachment, different ways of killing while standing in a conservative, middle-class décor. It was called "the most disturbing" and "the most accomplished" work of the exhibition.

Her video work Hvalreki (2009) was shot during the protests following the Iceland economy crash in October 2008. Loyche distilled an hour-long protest speech to a four-minute video that focuses on the sign language interpreter's real-time translation of the speech and the audience's reaction to it, pointing to the failure of communication in today's world ("Hvalreki" means "stranded" in Icelandic).

Loyche's 2008–9 series Minds/Mines don’t care are photograms of improvised explosive devices, similar to early cyanotype photogram botany studies. They also look like X-rays, which is a nod to the issues of paranoia and "homeland security". The title derives from the U.S. military issuing country-specific land mine identification card packs with the slogan: "Be Aware Mines Don’t Care."

She founded, directed, and curated Mitte’s MMX Open Art Venue along with her partner Jonathan Gröger in Linnienstrasse in 2010. After a year of continuous exhibitions, they opened a new artist-run space, CoVerlag, and made the first art show in April 2012. One of the exhibits was Loyche’s three-channel audio and video project entitled The Art Fair. A video shot during ArtForum Berlin was shown to three specialists in the fields of security, art, and psychology, respectively. Each specialist gave his or her own distinct "reading" of the people walking by. The work was a critique of voyeurism, surveillance culture and paranoia. In 2012, the developers who bought the MMX site invited Loyche and Gröger back, and they started re:MMX in September 2012, curating large-scale public art.

Loyche's 2010-2011 installation Circadian envelops the viewer in a white room of full-spectrum light. A soundtrack playing in the room lasts about fifteen minutes, which is the minimum length of time that the body needs to physically benefit from exposure to sunlight. It is composed of several layers of white noise, audio recordings from ocean depths, sound elements from nature and the human body, classical music, and analog audio players. The piece, questioning the artificial and the natural, takes its name from the circadian rhythm, the natural human cycle corresponding to a 24-hour day, which is governed by exposure to sunlight.

Her video work series Still Life I, II, and II (2011) presents several still life scenes. Each of them starts in silence, with objects on a table against a window. Debris begins dropping into the scene accompanied by loud noises of destruction. The scenes were recorded in an old building in Mitte undergoing renovation. Each still life was made from materials left behind in the rooms of the house. The historical still life format of capturing slow decay became the medium to show rapid destruction.

Loyche's work often deals with sexuality, from her earlier series of bronze vagina doorknobs to the 2014 video Profession – Sexual Assistant. In the video, one of Europe's pioneers in the field of sexuality talks about her work. The piece addresses the issues of the sexual needs of people who have a physical, social and/or mental disability or handicap.

Together with her husband Jonathan Loyche (né Gröger), she made Sonic Shanty, one of the Art Shanty Projects on White Bear Lake, Minnesota, in 2016. It is a hexagonal hut on the ice with a speaker connected to a hydrophone under the ice, reproducing the surrounding sounds. Piano wires resonate at the center. The entire hut is a musical instrument.

Much of Loyche's work examines the variability of human perception, the subjective nature of human experience, and the breakdown and failure of language.

== Main works ==
- Minds/Mines don’t care (2008–9)
- Hvalreki (2009)
- Circadian (2010–11)
- Still Life I, II, and II (2011)
- The Art Fair (2011)
- Profession – Sexual Assistant (2014)
