= Alana I. Capria =

American writer

- Born: 1985 (age 40–41); Long Island, New York
- Writing career
- Genres: Fiction, Feminist Horror, Experimental

Alana I. Capria (born 1985) is an American writer.

== Career ==
She is the author of the novels Mother Walked into the Lake (Kernpunkt Press, 2017) and Hooks and Slaughterhouse (Montag Press, 2013), and the short story collection Wrapped in Red (Montag Press, 2014). She has an MFA in creative writing from Fairleigh Dickinson University. Capria resides in Northern New Jersey. Her style can be described as Feminist Horror and merges fantastical narrative with historical references, as well as poetry.

Capria's books were part of an art exhibition called Post Partum Party at Rhombus Space, located in Red Hook, Brooklyn in 2014. For the exhibit, she joined other writers in reading from their latest books. Capria read from Organ Meat, Killing Me during the 2012 Boog City Poetry & Music Festival in Brooklyn.

Her short fiction has been published in a number of literary magazines and has been nominated for the 2014 Best of the Net and the 2015 Pushcart Prize. Capria was a regular contributor with the literary groups Mighty Mercury and the Step Chamber. Her most recent books were published by New York State's Kernpunkt Press and the micro niche publishing group Montag Press, an Oakland, California-based collective distributed by Small Press Distribution.

Mother Walked into the Lake's cover was illustrated by Joshua Lawyer. Wrapped in Red was illustrated by Katerina Lanfranco. Hooks and Slaughterhouse was illustrated by Rita Okusako. Capria has published her work extensively since 2009.

== Selected bibliography ==
- "Mother Walked Into the Lake" – Kernpunkt Press, 2017 (Novel)
- "Wrapped in Red" - Montag Press, 2014 (Short Story Collection).
- "Hooks and Slaughterhouse" - Montag Press, 2013 (Novel)
- "Lilith" - dancing girl press, 2015 (Chapbook)
- "Organ Meat, Killing Me" – Turtleneck Press, 2012 (Chapbook)
