= Annelys de Vet =

Dutch graphic designer (born 1974)

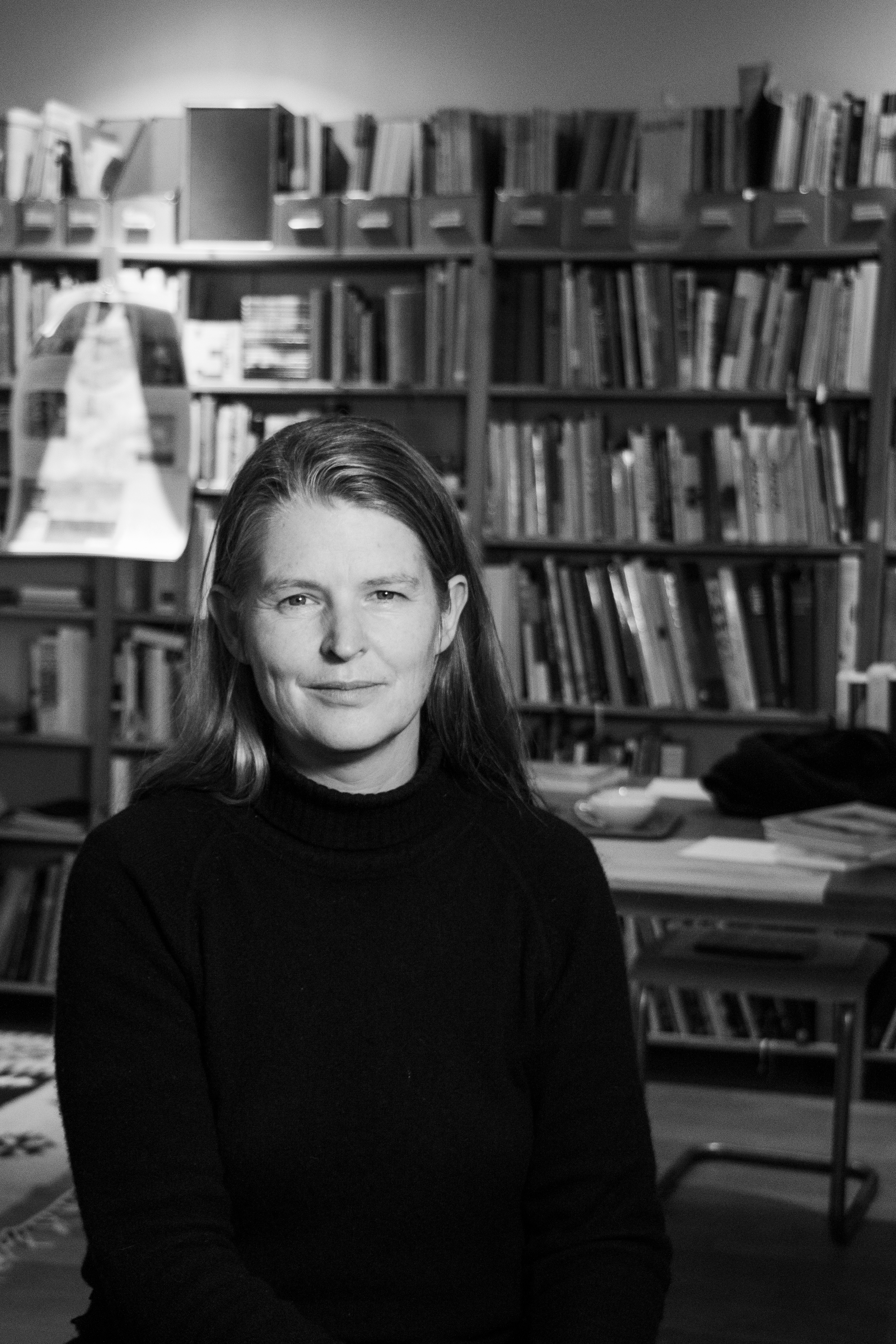
Annelys de Vet in her studio

Annelys de Vet (born 1974 in Alkmaar, The Netherlands) is a designer, educator and researcher. She runs her own design practice under the name DEVET. From 2009 until 2019 she headed the MA in Design 'Think tank for Visual strategies' at the Sandberg Instituut in Amsterdam, the master's course of the Gerrit Rietveld Academie. There she initiated the temporary masters course Disarming Design, from 2020 until 2022.

Annelys started the publishing initiative Subjective Editions in 2003. This project develops mapping publications of different regions globally in collaboration with local communities.

In 2012 she co-founded the design label Disarming Design from Palestine, in collaboration with the International Academy of Art Palestine and with support by ICCO (NL).

== Education ==
From 1991 until 1996 de Vet studied at Utrecht School of the Arts (Hogeschool voor de Kunsten Utrecht) where she obtained a bachelor in Graphic Design, after which she studied for an MFA in Design & Fine arts at Sandberg Instituut in Amsterdam between 1996 and 1999. Additionally she was an artist in residence at RMIT University (Melbourne) from 1999 until 2000, where she studied sculpture.

As of 2019 she is a PhD candidate at the Antwerp Research Institute for the Arts (ARIA)—a practice-led doctoral study at Sint Lucas School of Arts and University of Antwerp, where she researches the conditions of design pedagogy to counteract oppression and injustice through the act of design.

== Career ==
From 2003 until 2008 Annelys coordinated the Man & Communication department at the Design Academy Eindhoven. Between 2006 and 2009 she developed the concept and design for the Temporary Museum Amsterdam (Dutch: Tijdelijk Museum Amsterdam), the parallel programme to the annual art fair Art Amsterdam.

In 2009 she was appointed course director at the design department of Sandberg Institute in Amsterdam, a position she held until 2019. She also headed the masterclass for digital storytelling 'Sandberg@Mediafonds' from 2010 until the end of her directorship at the institute. During this period, in 2015, she moved her studio to the Pajottenland—in the vicinity of Brussels—a space she shares with Dutch artist Rudy Luijters.

Together with Nuno Coelho she curated the exhibition Unmapping the World as part of the Experimenta International Design Biennial in 2013, which had as a theme "No Borders". Here de Vet and Coelho aimed to unveil the apparent neutrality of professional cartography. The works they selected are all contemporary engaged mapping projects. For the 22nd edition of the international Graphic Design Biennial in Chaumont in 2015 de Vet was invited to head the student competition, as well as curate the exhibition of student work. Unmapping the World also served as the theme for this competition, recurring from the title of the Experimenta Design '13 exhibition.

=== Subjective Editions ===
De Vet founded the publishing initiative Subjective Editions in 2003. This project works together with local communities from different regions globally to design a 'Subjective Atlas' for that region. They invite several artists, designers, photographers and architects to map their country, environment or social concerns from their own perspective during a series of workshops. Their intent is, mainly, to show the complex realities of these places in stark contrast to overly simplistic media images.

=== Disarming Design From Palestine ===
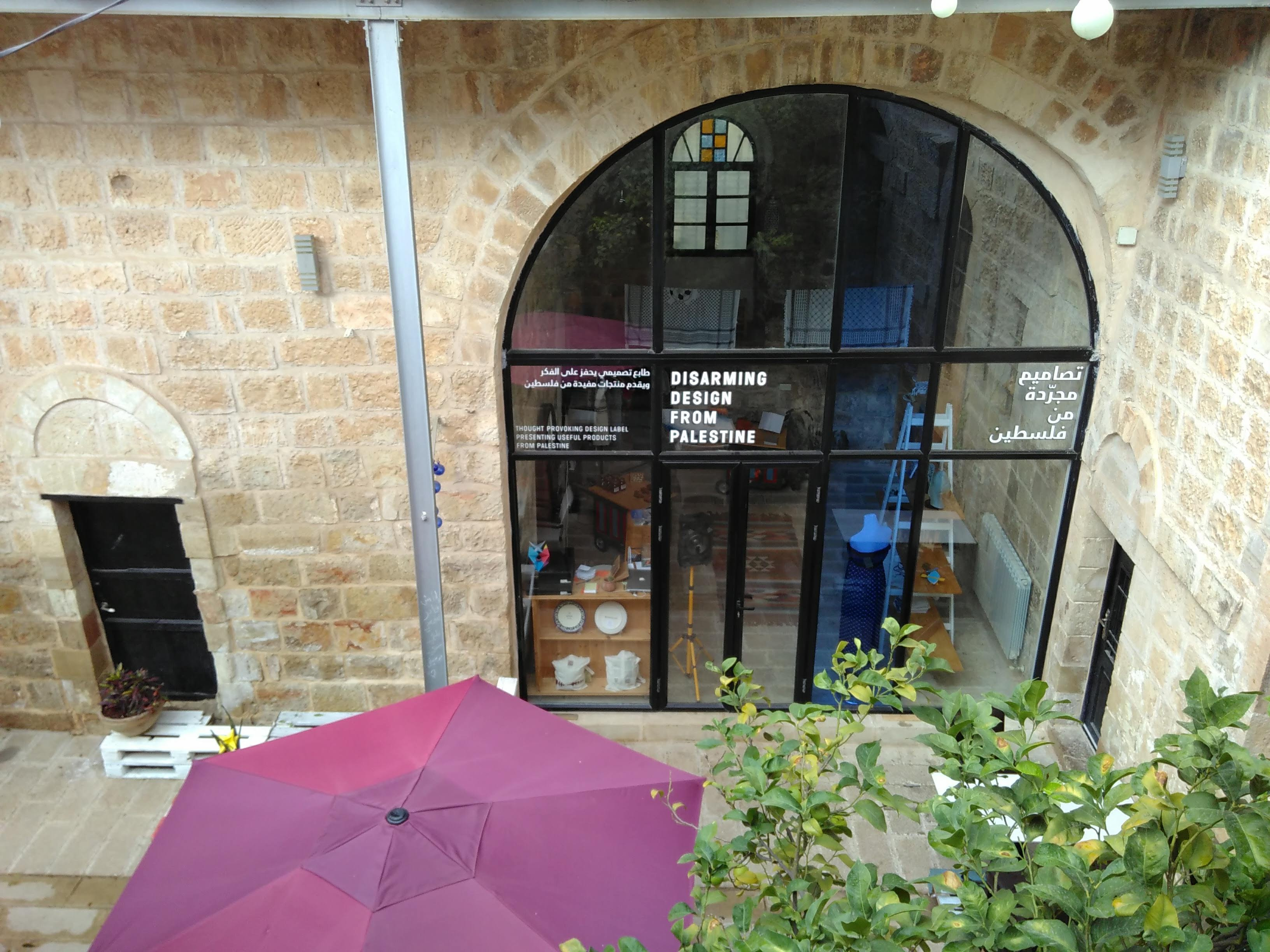
Disarming Design from Palestine shop in Birzeit

Annelys co-founded the project Disarming Design from Palestine, a design label for the presentation and development of contemporary design from Palestine. This project was set up in collaboration with the International Academy of Art Palestine on the invitation of the Dutch NGO ICCO and became an independent organisation in 2015. Working closely together with local designers and artisans in Palestine, the label strives to narrate the human experience through its products. Through the Disarming Design platform objects made by Palestinian designers and artists are being promoted and sold in the rest of the world. The items made by these creatives are produced in close collaboration with local artisans. With their short supply chain they aim to contribute to a sustainable and human-centered economy.

== Selected Other Work ==
Annelys has taken on various roles in the conception of different publications, mainly (but not limited to) working as editor, designer and writer.

- The Public Role of the Graphic Designer/De Publieke Zaak van de Grafisch Ontwerper (2006): a self-initiated publication, co-edited with Roelien Plaatsman and Joris Visser.
- Nieuwe Symbolen voor Nederland (2005): edited by Rutger Wolfson and designed by de Vet, published by VALIZ. (Dutch)
- Kwintessens #97 (2016): where she acted as guest-editor and designer, published by Design Vlaanderen & Flanders Fashion Institute. (Dutch)
- Design Dedication, Adaptive Mentalities on Design Education (2020): edited by de Vet, with various contributions from designers, educators and students. Published by Valiz.

Her practice also encompasses spatial interventions and product design, including:

- Among Us/Onder Ons (2004): performance for Dutch orchestra De Volharding, in collaboration with Mayke Nas.
- Between the Lines (2008): installation of 21 illuminated niches containing short phrases for the Public Prosecution Service building in Lelystad, NL.
- For everything there is a season (2012): set of 12 tea towels for Dutch design firm Droog.
- My cup of thoughts (2012): cup and saucer depicting various combinations of statements for Droog
- New Urgencies (2018): installation for the exhibition OCCUPATION:DESIGNER at MAD Brussels.
