= Frank Tjepkema =

Dutch designer

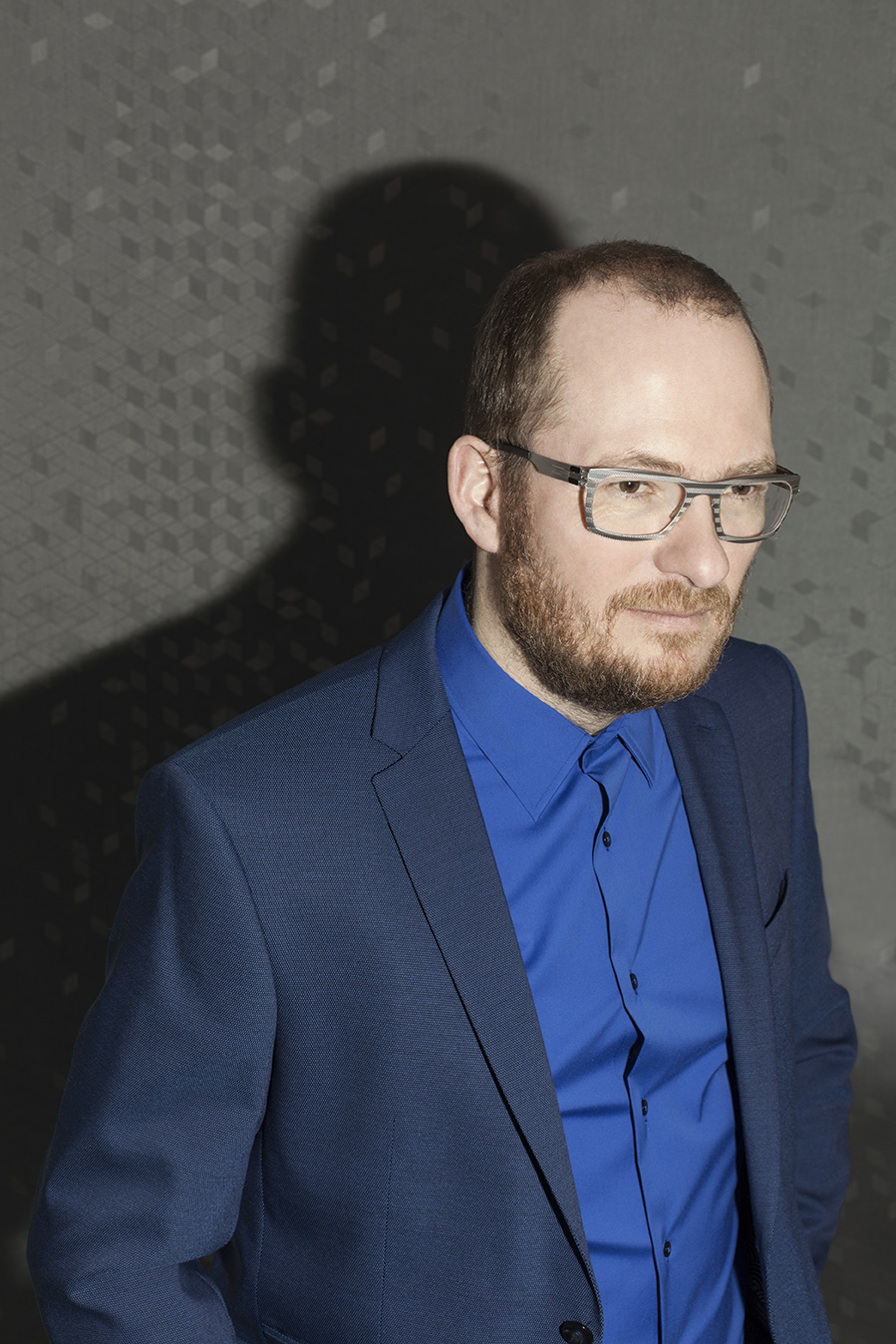
- Born: 1970 (age 55–56)
- Website: tjep.com

Frank Tjepkema (born 1970) is a Dutch designer based in Amsterdam. He works in interior design, architecture, product design, visual design and jewellery. He is most known for his collections, Bronze Age, Future Nostalgia, Clockwork Love, and his interior design projects. In 2014, at the Amsterdam Light Festival, he installed Light Bridge on a bridge along the Amstel river that received considerable media attention.

Tjepkema is the founder and principal of Tjep., a design studio in Amsterdam.

== Early life and education ==
Tjepkema was born in 1970. He grew up in Geneva, Brussels and New York City. In 1989, he settled in the Netherlands to study industrial design. He studied for two years at the Delft University of Technology after which he transferred to the Design Academy Eindhoven. In 1996 Tjepkema graduated cum laude and subsequently started a MA at the Sandberg Institute in Amsterdam. He obtained a degree from this institute in 1998.

== Work ==
Tjepkema's graduation project was selected for the Droog Design collection which eventually resulted in several collaborations between the two. In 2000, he worked with Droog on Do Break, the British Airways Executive Lounge at London Heathrow in 2004 and the Chair of Textures, which was introduced at Art Basel Miami in collaboration with Friedman Benda in 2006. The design for British Airways executive lounge won the Dutch Design award in 2004.

After initially working for Philips Design, he set up his own design studio called Tjep. together with Janneke Hooymans in 2001. Through Tjep., he has worked with Ikea, British Airways, Philips and Heineken. Tjepkema has designed products, furniture and accessories. He has also worked with restaurants and other establishments for the development of concepts and interiors notably important areas of Schiphol Airport Lounge 3 and Lounge 4.

He has taught at various institutes including Design Academy Eindhoven, the Rietveld Academy in Amsterdam, Universidad Iberoamericana Mexico City, Iceland Academy of The Arts Reykjavik, The Acadia Summer Arts Program Maine USA. He also lectured at Design Academy Eindhoven, The Universidad Iberoamericano Mexico City, and Iceland Academy of the Arts Reykjavik. He was Head of Department at the Amsterdam Rietveld Academy from 2001 to 2004.

Tjepkema has been a member of the board of the Premsela Foundation and a member of the examination commission of the Dutch Foundation for Art and Design. He has been a jury member for the Dutch Design Awards and the Françoise van der Bosch awards. Frank Tjepkema was awarded two Dutch Design Awards and has been a frequent lecturer at international design events such as Design Indaba, What Design Can Do and The Design 2050 Challenge in Singapore.

=== Bling Bling ===
Bling Bling was jewellery piece designed by Tjepkema for Chi ha paura…? (CHP). Each jewellery piece consisted of several logos of famous brands. Bling Bling and the connected design for a cathedral of logos, The Next Bling have been displayed at numerous exhibitions and museums and has won the Dutch Design Award in 2004. Bling Bling is part of the permanent collection of the Stedelijk Museum Amsterdam and was featured on the cover of Design Week in 2004.

=== Oogst ===
Oogst was designed by Tjepkema as a vision of future farming. It was designed in three chapter (Oogst 1: Solo, Oogst 100: Community, Oogst 1000: Wonderland). The project involved three new proposals for farms that combine technology with regards to self-sustaining living and agricultural systems. Each one of the closed system in the designed supplied its own energy and water supply and recycled waster and carbon, with food grown in a greenhouse and in the surrounds where possible. Oogst was introduced as part of the exhibition Hyperlinks at the Art Institute of Chicago in 2011.

=== Future Nostalgia ===
Tjepkema collaborated with DutchDNA in 2013 to develop jewellery and furniture items from the DNA of people. The collection was presented at Ventura Lambrate during the Salone Del Mobile in Milano under the title “Future Nostalgia." DutchDNA's CEO Erik Wolthuis had the idea to design jewellery first through genetic mapping. He reached out to Tjepkema with the idea, and after realising the potential genetic data had to augment design, they expanded to furniture. Following the initial show at Milan, Tjep. opened to commissioned projects for DNA furniture. Wired Magazine wrote about the idea that, "Tjepkema and Wolthuis seem to have tapped into a new way of humanizing data...and used it to create something beautiful and practical."

=== Isolée ===
In 2013, Tjepkema and his company designed Isolée, which was a model three story retreat home that was self-sufficient. The house had tree-like spindles of photovoltaic panels that sprout from its roof, supplying enough energy to recharge the batteries in the home’s LED lights. Two sides of the building envelope were clad in hinged slats of wood, which could be opened or closed depending on the weather. The design of the house received positive reviews with Fast writing that "Tjep deserves kudos for imagining the future" and PSFK writing that "although it is intended to be a retreat from the modern world, it is also a testament to it."

=== Clockwork Love ===
Tjepkema launched a jewellery collection, Clockwork Love in 2013. The collection included multi-layered paper hearts designed and created by Tjepkema. Tjepkema made the hearts using paper and acrylic. They were made in a gold collection, Clockwork Love Gold, and a white collection, Clockwork Love Paper, and were first shown as part of an exhibition at Gallery Ra in Amsterdam. Each heart in the collection represented different heart moods. Trend Hunter wrote about the collection that "made to look mechanical, they are stunning pendants that represent the complexity of the heart and the feeling of love."

=== Bronze Age ===
Tjepkema unveiled Bronze Age in October 2014 at the Colloredo Mansfeld Palace during Designblok Prague. The collection included furniture pieces, handcrafted out of bronze. Bronze Age stemmed from the Tjep.'s 2011 Recession Chair—a mass-produced Ikea chair reduced in part to a skeletal shape. The collection received a lot of media attention. Prague Post wrote that "even though the collection is based on the classic furniture terminology, it focuses on cultural, environmental and conceptual themes."

=== Light Bridge ===
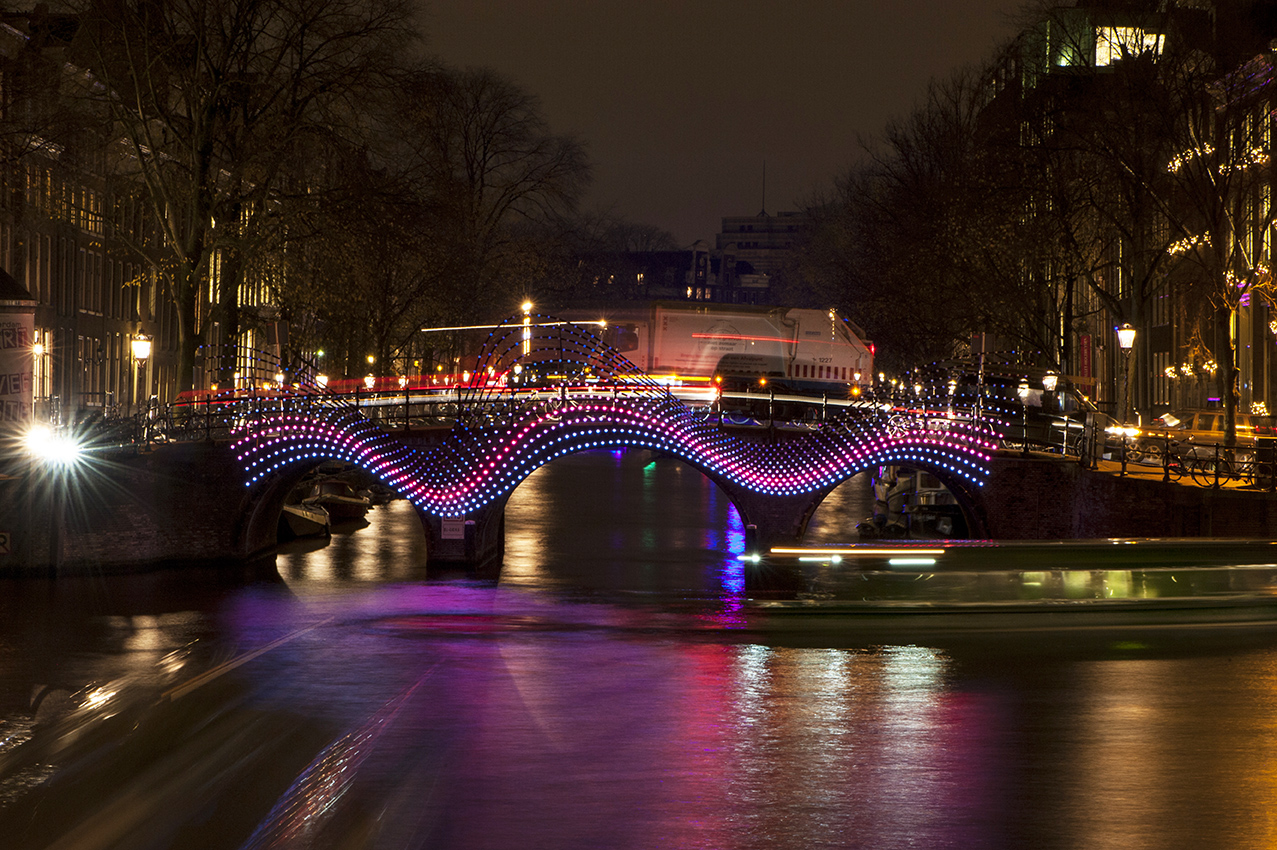
Light Bridge

Light Bridge, a light installation that Tjepkema installed on a bridge along Amstel river during the Amsterdam Light Festival of 2014, was made up of 1200 lights reacting to movements like bicycles passing over the bridge it was attached to or boats passing beneath from the Amstel. Design Boom positively reviewed Lightbridge writing that "[Tjep.] has created a luminous, undulating installation along the amstel in the center of the city."

== Public collections ==
Tjepkema's work is part of the permanent collections of the following institutions:

- Museum of Art and Design
- Stedelijk Museum of Modern Art
- Rijksmuseum
- Centraal Museum
- Museum ’t Kruithuis, Den Bosch
- Museum für Kunst und Gewerbe, Hamburg
