= Koert van Mensvoort =

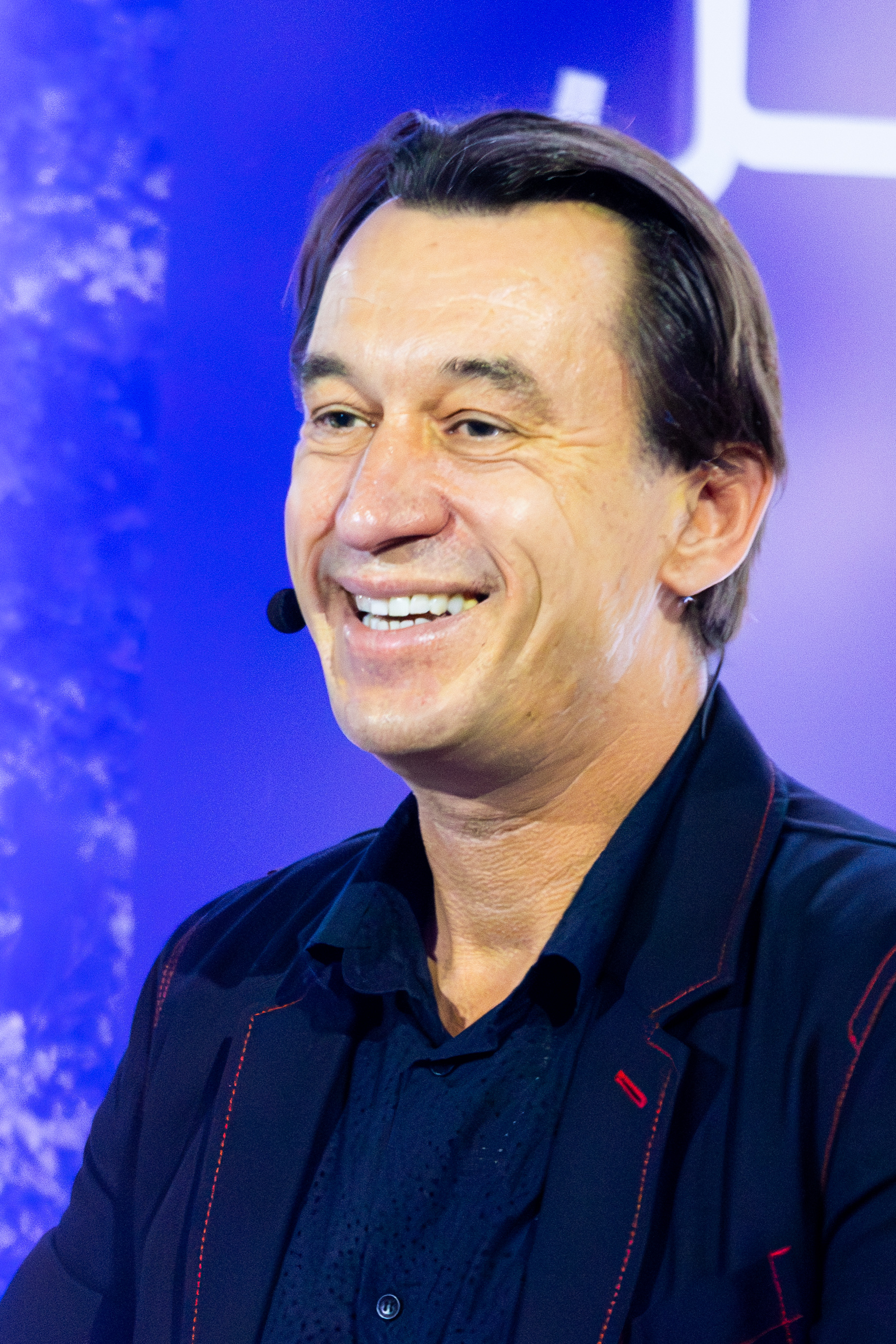
Koert van Mensvoort, 2024

Koert van Mensvoort (born 9 April 1974) is an artist, philosopher and scientist best known for his work on the philosophical concept of Next Nature. He is the founder and director of Next Nature Network, a non-profit organization that aims to go forward to nature.

== Academic ==
Van Mensvoort is currently a Next Nature Fellow and the former head of the Next Nature Lab at the Industrial Design Department at the Eindhoven University of Technology, a position he has held from 2003 until 2015. In 1997 Van Mensvoort received a Master of Science degree in computer science, specializing in computer graphics from the Eindhoven University of Technology. In 2000 he completed a Master of Fine Arts degree at the Sandberg Institute in Amsterdam. In 2008 he was Visionary in Residence at Art Center College of Design in Pasadena. Van Mensvoort received a doctorate from the Eindhoven University of Technology in 2009 for his thesis What You See Is What You Feel. Van Mensvoort is the founder and director of the Next Nature Museum based in Eindhoven, the Netherlands.

== Projects ==
Van Mensvoort works in many different media to materialize his philosophy. Most of his multi-media projects are concerned with how technology becomes so omnipresent, intricate and uncontrollable we start to perceive it as a nature of its own. Notable projects

- The Retro Future exhibition about the future thinking of the past, in the Evoluon.
- The VR Timemachine: Trip to Big Future, in the Evoluon. A virtual reality experience that sends its visitors billions of years into future.
- Letter to Humanity Addressed to all 8 billion people on Earth and translated in twenty-five languages. It encourages humans not to be slaves or victims of their own technology, but to use technology to enhance our humanity.
- The Rise and Fall of Rayfish Footwear online film project on the fictional company Rayfish.com that offered personalized sneakers crafted from genetically modified stingray leather.
- The book Next Nature: Nature Changes Along With Us. Scientific American magazine wrote in a review that “next nature can give us a new vocabulary and a new philosophy to see and design the world.”
- The NANO Supermarket a mobile exhibition featuring nanotech products that might be on the market within the next ten years.
- The Datafountain, is an internet-enabled water fountain connected to money currency rates.
- The documentary Daddy! The Woods Smell of Shampoo, exploring the intimate role media play in our society: how the media have become fundamentally part of the cycle through which we create meaning and it effectively becomes impossible to distinguish media from reality.
- The Fake for Real memory game on the tension between reality and simulation.
- The online interactive dance film Drift, featuring a dancer without a body but kinetic points in space, dance and choreography by Nancy Mauro-Flude.
- The Biggest Visual Power Show, a pop conference held in Amsterdam, Zollverein and Los Angeles.

== Books ==
Van Mensvoort has co-authored numerous books and publications.

- Next Nature: Why Technology is our Natural Future,
- The In Vitro Meat Cookbook
- Next Nature: Nature Changes Along With Us, edited and designed by Koert van Mensvoort and Hendrik-Jan Grievink. The book examines people’s notion of nature and how the image of nature as static, balanced and harmonic is naive and up for reconsideration. Where technology and nature are traditionally seen as opposed, they now appear to merge or even trade places.
- Visual Power
- What You See Is What You Feel
- Natuur 2.0
- Entry Paradise – New Worlds of Design
- Artvertising
- Style First

== Lectures and speeches ==
- Nature Talks Back, Future Forum, Dubai, 2024
- Nike Creative Summit, Nike World Headquarters, Portland, 2023
- EuroAzia Media Forum, Kazachstan, 2021
- Future Mobility, SINTEF, Oslo, Norway, 2020
- Next Nature @OCT Art & Design Gallery, Shenzhen, China, 2019
- Meat the Future, IKRA Food Festival, Moscow, 2019
- Future Companionship with Animals Summit, Paris, 2018
- Dangerous Futures, Trondheim Norway, 2018
- Forum of the Future, Porto, 2017
- Meet the Media Guru, Milan, 2017
- Open Set, Seoul, 2016
- Next Nature: How Technology becomes Nature, SXSW 2015, Austin, Texas, 2015
- Designer Organisms, Biofabricate 2014, Microsoft Technology Center, New York, USA, 2014
- What if.., Thailand Creative Design Center, Bangkok, Thailand, 2014
- ASML Techtalk, ASML, Veldhoven, The Netherlands, 2013
- Eindhoven University Lecture 2013, Eindhoven, The Netherlands, 2013
- Next Nature, TEDx Danubia, Budapest, Hungary, 2013
- DesignMarch, Iceland Design Festival, Reykjavik, Iceland, 2012
- Next Ecology, Amber Festival, Istanbul, Turkey, 2011
- Real Nature is Not Green, Wilderness Festival, Oxfordshire, UK, 2011
- Nano Supermarket, TEDx, Eindhoven, 2011
- HAIP New Nature, Ljubiana, Slovenia, 2010
- Money as a Medium, Follow the Money Conference, De Balie, Amsterdam, 2010
- Nature Transformer – Microwave Festival, Hong Kong, China, 2009
- Paralelo Lecture, Museum of Image and Sound, São Paulo, Brazil, 2009
- Software Studies, UCSD Center for Research in Computing and the Arts, San Diego, 2008
- Lecture Real Nature is not Green, Farmlab, Los Angeles, 2008
- Media Department, University of Xiamen, China, 2007
- Next Nature, STRP Festival Art & Technology, Eindhoven, 2006
- Wat je ziet bestaat niet!, Communication Museum, the Hague, 2004
- White Lady Lecture, Design Academy, Eindhoven, 2003
- Lecture, Empathy and Machines, Zaplab, Eindhoven, 2002
- Perceptions in Illusion, the Day of Design 2001, Eindhoven, 2001
