= Droog (company) =

Dutch design company

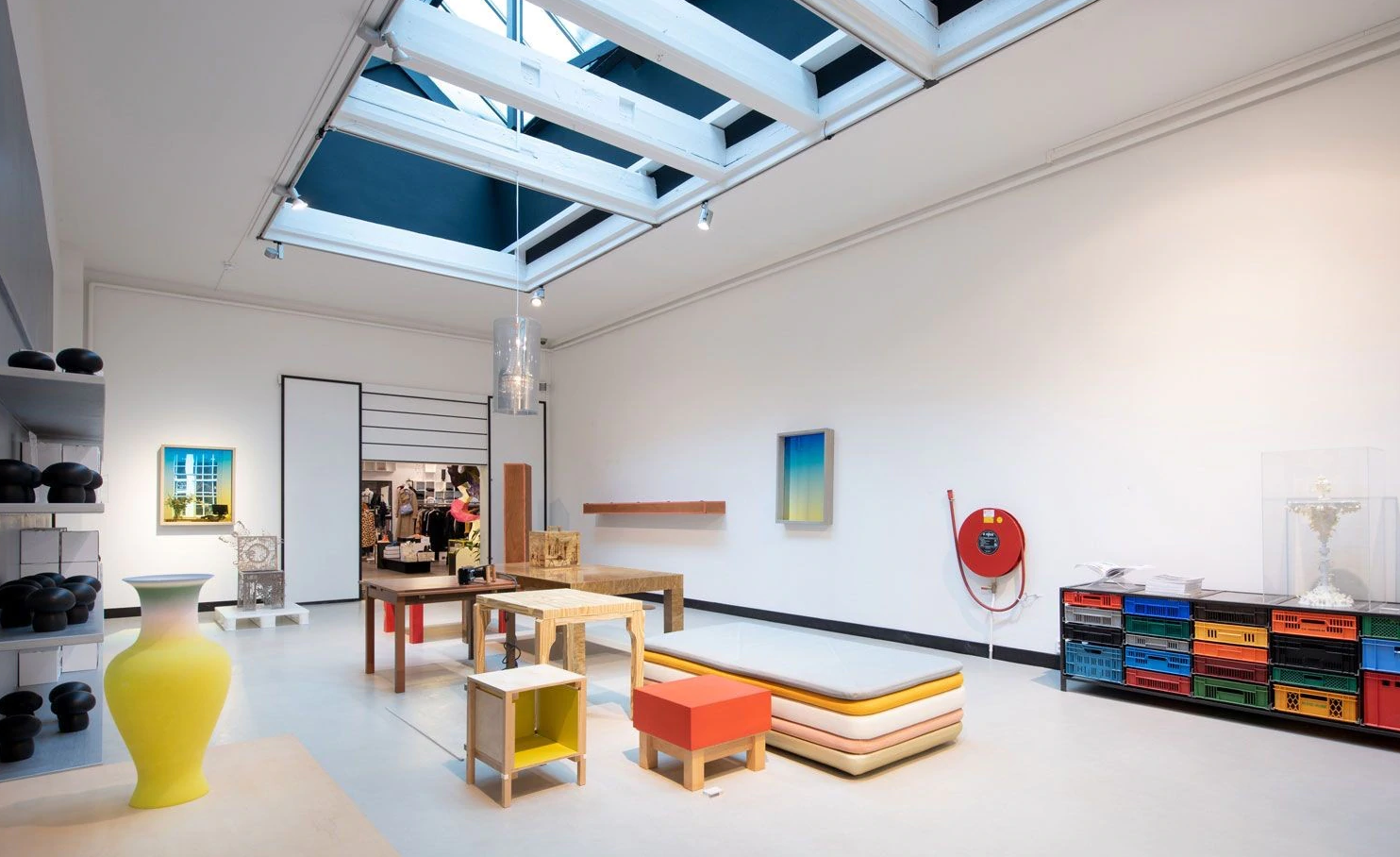
- Industry: design, exhibitions, restaurant, offices
- Founded: Amsterdam, Netherlands (1993)
- Founder: Renny Ramakers; Gijs Bakker
- Headquarters: Amsterdam, Netherlands
- Products: design furniture
- Website: droog.com

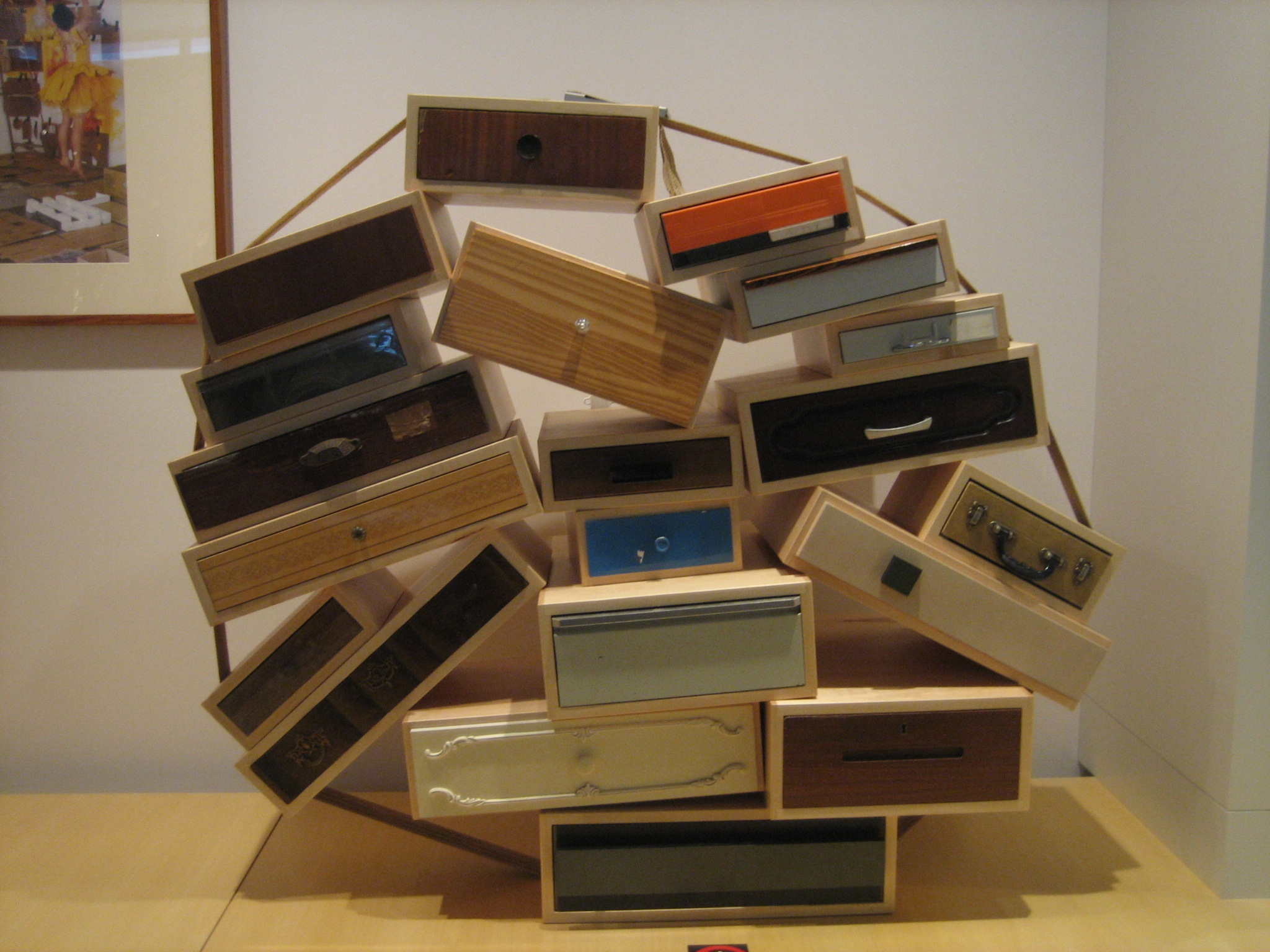
Chest of Drawers designed by Tejo Remy (1960) is part of the Droog collection

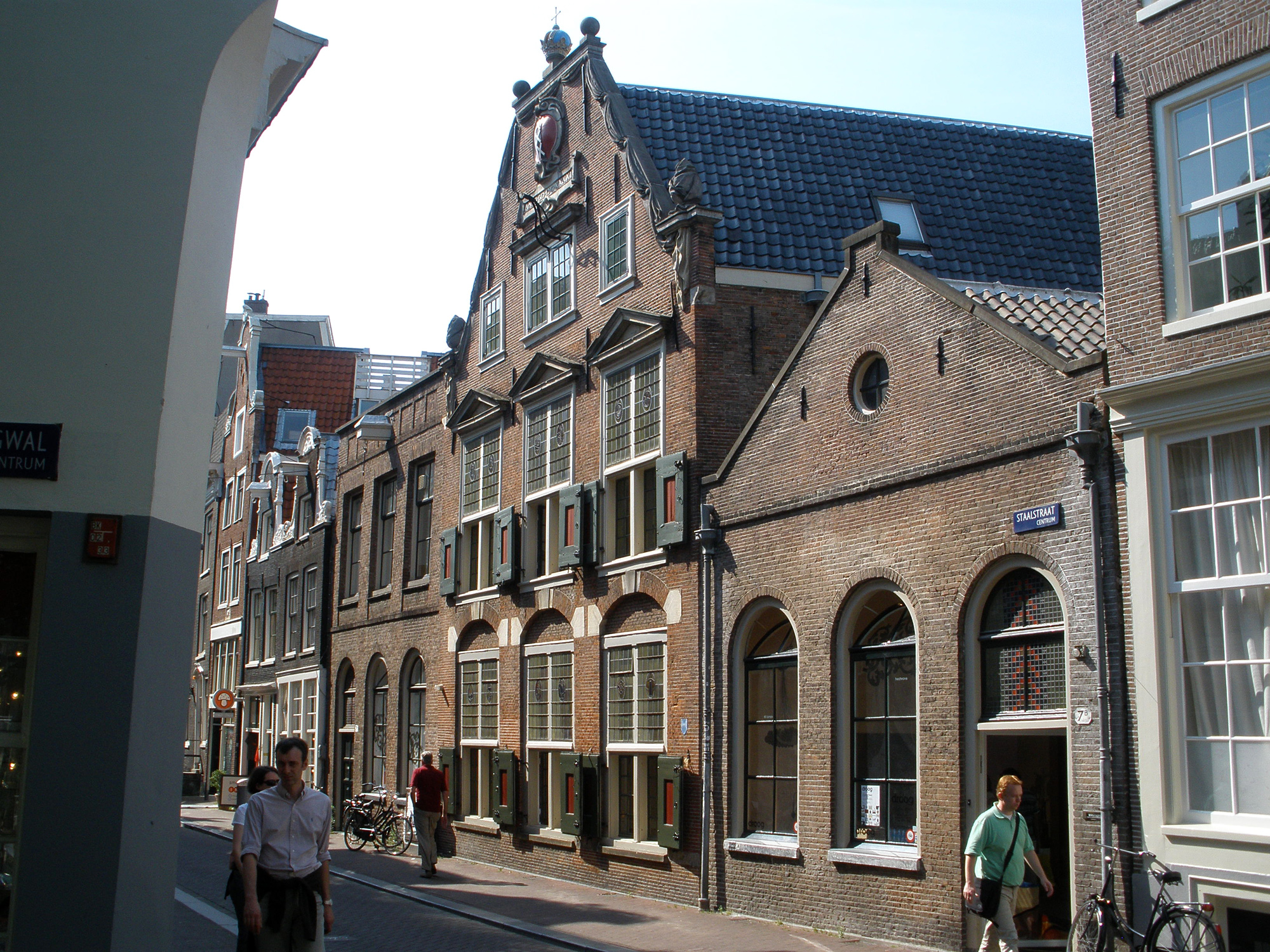
Droog headquarters in the Staalstraat in Amsterdam, Netherlands

Droog (droog is a Dutch word meaning "dry") is a conceptual Dutch design company situated in Amsterdam, Netherlands. Droog has realised products, projects, exhibitions and events. Droog is an internationally renowned design label [1] and one of the most famous exponents of Dutch Design. Droog worked with well known designers such as Marcel Wanders, Hella Jongerius, Tejo Remy, Richard Hutten, Ed Annink, Jurgen Bey and Joris Laarman.

== History ==
Droog was founded in 1993 by product designer Gijs Bakker and art and design historian Renny Ramakers to promote contemporary Dutch design. The founders had selected work by young Dutch designers in which they saw a new trend in the reuse of everyday objects combined with a down-to-earth mentality. They presented these works at the Salone del Mobile, the international furniture fair in Milan. The presentation was called "Droog", meaning "dry" in Dutch, because of the simplicity and dry humor of the objects. The exhibition was a success and afterwards the Droog Design Foundation was established to promote and develop innovative design.

Gijs Bakker and Renny Ramakers expanded Droog in the Netherlands and abroad in the next decades, with a presentation every year at the Salone del Mobile in Milan. In 2003 Droog started producing and distributing their own collection, and in 2004 the Droog headquarters opened in Amsterdam, with shop, gallery, restaurant and offices. Gijs Bakker went his own way in 2009, Ramakers is still the director of Droog. In 2018 they were both awarded with the Dutch Royal Honour.

Designs from the Droog collection are included in museums worldwide, such as the Stedelijk Museum Amsterdam, the Museum of Modern Art in New York, the Victoria & Albert Museum in London. Droog has released several publications, such as Droog Design-Spirit of the Nineties, Simply Droog and Here, There, Everywhere.

== Projects, exhibitions and events ==
Dry Tech was Droog's first experimental project, in collaboration with Delft University of Technology, with one of the results being the Knotted chair by Marcel Wanders.

After the first presentation at the Salone del Mobile in Milan, a new project was presented every year until 2015, for example as Go Slow, Value for Money, Hotel Droog, Do Create, Smart Deco 2, Saved by Droog, Design for Download and Construct Me.

From 2004 to 2007, under the title Simply Droog, retrospectives took place in the Haus der Kunst in Munich, the Gemeentemuseum Den Haag, Museo Oscar Niemeyer in Curitiba (Brazil) and the Museum of Arts & Design in New York. On this occasion, a book was published about Droog, Simply Droog: 10 + 1 years of creating innovation and discussion. This book was expanded and reissued in 2006 under the title Simply Droog: 10 + 3 years of creating innovation and discussion.

Other traveling exhibitions included: Do Create (Tokyo, London, New York, Rotterdam, 2000) a presentation of interior designs that turned into something new by an action ('do'); Go Slow (Milan, New York, Rotterdam, London, Tokyo, 2004), a café setting celebrating the luxury of slowness, attention and care; A Human Touch (Shanghai, Jakarta, New Zealand, Melbourne and Sydney 2006) with products of the Droog collection that could be touched by visitors, and Material Matters (Eindhoven, Milan, Shenzhen, 2014), which presented speculative strategies on how to deal with material scarcity.

From 2009 to 2015, a series of projects took place under the title Droog Lab. In collaboration with local partners and experts, design teams traveled to various places in the world, from New York, China, Moscow, Dubai, Mumbai, Belgium to the far north of Canada. Guided by a theme, they explored what could be learned from the various locations. The results were both visionary and practical in nature. The projects encompassed different disciplines: identity, fashion, food and product design, experience design and urban design. The Droog Lab projects are bundled in the book Here, There, Everywhere.

In 2018, on the occasion of the 25th anniversary of Droog, the exhibition Enter the Past and See the Future was presented in the Droog gallery in Amsterdam, and the retrospective Do it Like Droog in Museum Kranenburgh.

== Droog Amsterdam ==
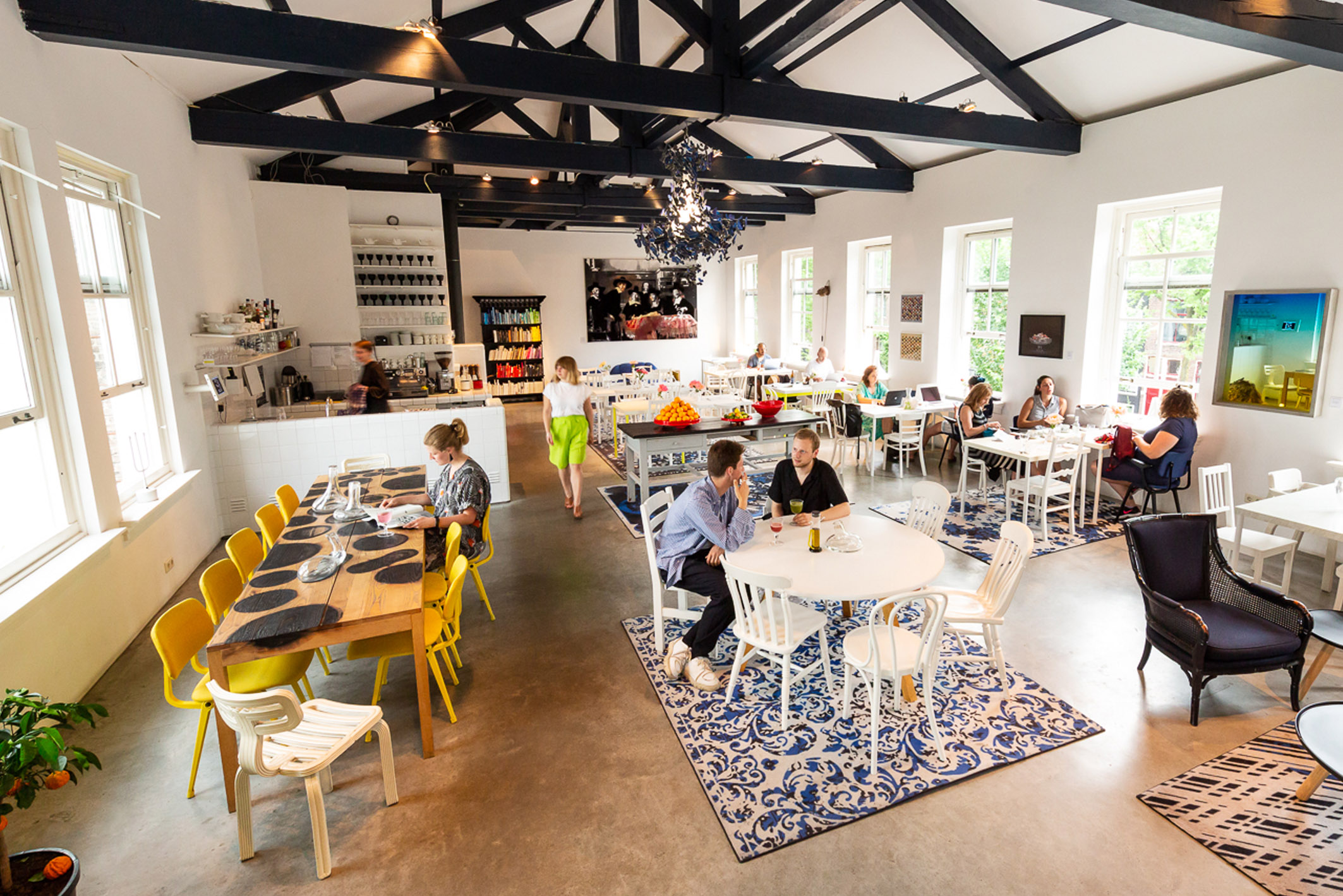
Droog Restaurant in Amsterdam

Since 2004, Droog has been located in an historic building in the Staalstraat in Amsterdam. Following an extension of the building to the adjacent former GGD building, Hôtel Droog was opened in 2012. All elements of a contemporary hotel were present: shop, restaurant, meeting rooms, exhibition space, a garden, a library and a lobby, but there was only one hotel room. The spaces were partly furnished with items from the Droog collection.

As a tribute to Rembrandt's painting Syndics of the Draper's Guild from 1662, which was a commission from the guild that was located in the building, there is now a contemporary interpretation of this painting, made by artist Berend Strik, on view in the restaurant. The Fairytale Garden, designed by Claude Pasquer and Corinne Détroyat is a garden but also a work of art.

Since 2018, the restaurant on the first floor has been the center of the building, the shop is now only online based. Part of the spaces are used for weddings, events, presentations and meetings by external parties. There are also co-working spaces. The entire ground floor of approximately 400 m2 is exhibition space. Droog is host to varying exhibitions, such as The Design Loket and Space is the Place by Mieke Gerritzen in 2019 and Onward & Upward by Liselore Frowijn and Renny Ramakers in 2020.

== Publications (a selection) ==
- Renny Ramakers, Gijs Bakker, Droog Design. Droog Design: Spirit of the Nineties. 1998.
- Ida van Zijl, Droog Design - 1991-1996, 1997.
- Renny Ramakers, Less + More: Droog Design in Context, 2002.
- Aaron Betsky, Simply Droog 10+3 years, 2006.
- Renny Ramakers, Agata Jaworska, Here, There, Everywhere, 2014
