= Ruud-Jan Kokke =

Dutch designer

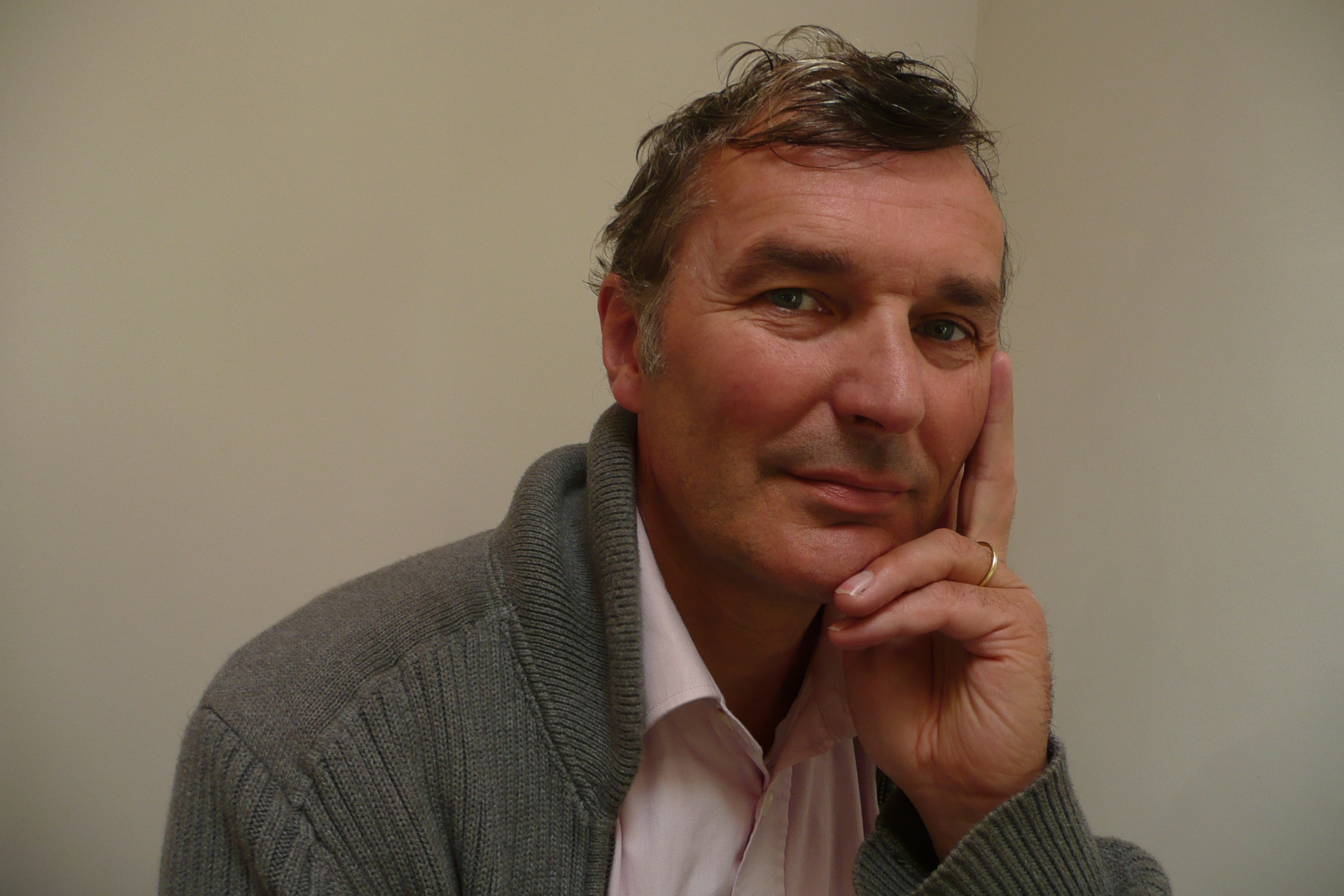
Ruud-Jan Kokke

Ruud-Jan Kokke (Velp, 1956) is a Dutch designer who started his career in the mid-eighties and became known for his furniture, inventive objects, interiors and designs for public space. He has received numerous nominations and awards. He is married to the visual artist and jewellery designer Petra Hartman.

== Career ==
Ruud-Jan Kokke studied at the Sociale Academie (College for Social Studies) and at the Academy of Fine Arts in Arnhem. He is considered a designer in the tradition of Gerrit Rietveld developing his first chairs in his workshop. In 1986 he started his own label, Ruud-Jan Kokke Product & Design. Since then his furniture has been produced by companies such as Metaform, Leolux, Spectrum Design Eindhoven, Kembo, Auping and Ahrend. His first interior designs date from the early nineties. In close cooperation with his partner, Petra Hartman, he has also designed various school interiors.

== Objects ==
The Kokke chair designed in 1984, was first produced in series by Metaform in 1988 and can now be found in the permanent collection of the Stedelijk Museum Amsterdam. It is made of flexible slats and has a transparent and strong structure. The notorious TC museum stool from 1990 was made for Museum Boijmans Van Beuningen in Rotterdam and is named after Trees Coenders, who was looking for a lightweight stool that was easy to carry and also easy to stack. It is now serving in several other museums and is collected by the MoMa New York under the title “Wander” Stacking Stool. Four years later, in 1992, Kokke designed the Kokkestok, a walking stick which is easy to use because of the long curl, the stiff end and the rubber strip on the side. Several other furniture designs followed, often in commission, such as the chairs for the restaurant of the Province House in Groningen in 1991, the Next bed for Auping (1996) and the Ahrend Run sofa (2009). In 2013 he developed Zami, an ergonomically designed stool, in close cooperation with the orthopaedic surgeon Piet van Loon.

== Interior design and design for public space ==
In the mid-1990s, interior and public space became increasingly important. Often this concerned the upgrading of squares and parks or the renovation of existing buildings, such as the City Hall Arnhem (2007/2008) and several local Rabobank buildings. With the new millennium Kokke started a series of interior designs for schools, such as Mozaïek College Arnhem (2001/2002), Het Stedelijk Zutphen (2010) and Canisius College Nijmegen (2016), and sports facilities, such as Olympiaplein Amsterdam (2008).

== Museum Acquisitions ==
- Kruk TC [TC Stool]: MoMA, New York, Cooper Hewitt New York; Museum für Angewandte Kunst Köln; Stedelijk Museum Amsterdam; Kunstgewerbe Museum Berlin; Design Museum Denmark
- Kokke seats: Museum für Angewandte Kunst Cologne; Stedelijk Museum Amsterdam
- Tray: Museum Arnhem
- Moment [bench]:Stedelijk Museum Amsterdam; Museum Arnhem
- Kokkestok [stick]: Museum Boijmans van Beuningen Rotterdam; MoMA New York; Stedelijk Museum Amsterdam
- Chair OT: Stedelijk Museum Amsterdam

== Exhibitions ==
- 1994: Museum Für Angewandte Kunst Cologne: Made in Holland, Design aus den Niederlanden
- 1996: MoMA New York: Thresholds, Contemporary Design from the Netherlands
- 2010: Lingam: Utrecht, Stockholm, Mons, New York
- 2012: Alliantie, Duo's Ellecom

== Awards/Nominations ==
- Kruk TC[TC stool]:The International Contemporary Furniture Fair New York, 1992; Form ‘92, Frankfurt, 1992
- Kokkestok [Kokke stick]: Gelderland Design Award, 1994; Rotterdam Design Award, 1995
- Moment [bench]: Good Industrial Design Recognition, 1995; Industrie Forum Design Award Hannover, 1996; Red Dot, Design Innovation Award of Design Centre North Rhine-Westphalia, 1996
- Chair Harvink: Dutch Furniture Award, 1997 (honourable mention)
- Fence: Design to Business (audience award), 2008; Dutch Design Award, 2008
- City Hall Arnhem: Arnhem Willem Diehl Award, 2009
- Kitchen: MKB Innovation Top Hundred, 2013
- Pavilion Stadsblokken Arnhem: Dutch Sustainability Prize Steel, 2016

== Notable objects and projects ==
- 1990: TC Stool, Museum Boijmans van Beuningen, Rotterdam
- 1994: Furniture, Design Institute Amsterdam
- 1991: Furniture, Restaurant Province House, Groningen
- 1997: Home Furnishing, (1160 student rooms) Wageningen
- 1998: Street Soccer Field, Amsterdam
- 1999: Home Furnishing (student and professor rooms), Leiden
- 2001: Mozaïek College, Arnhem
- 2003: Beekdal Lyceum, Arnhem
- 2004: Fence Olympia Square Amsterdam; Halve Maan Sports facility
- 2004: Brede School, Oosterbeek
- 2004: Parking facility, Pompekliniek, Nijmegen
- 2005/2014: Local Rabobank buildings (5 different buildings)
- 2007/2008: Renovation and restoration, City Hall and Square Arnhem
- 2011: T-huis Presikhaaf, Arnhem
- 2012: Design Pas dwellings, Het Dorp, Arnhem
- 2015: Bridges, balconies, balustrades incl. Coolhaven Rotterdam
- 2016: Summer Residence [pavilion], Stadsblokken Arnhem
- 2016: Folly Koningsberg, Rozendaal (Province of Gelderland)

== Publications ==
- Alphen, Frans van, Nooit meer met krukken langs de deur, NRC 4 June 1992
- Horsham, Michael, Jennifer Hudson and Richard Sapper, The International Design Yearbook 1998, London 1998, ISBN 1856691241
- Houtenbrink, Erwin, Ida Jager and Johannes Niemeijer, Het meubelboek: Nederlands meubelontwerp 1986–1996, Den Haag 1996, ISBN 9090101519
- Lueg, Gabriele (ed.), Made in Holland, Design aus den Niederlanden, Tübingen and Berlin 1994, ISBN 3803030617
- Morgan, C. Lloyd (author) and Alessandro Mendini (ed.)The International Design Yearbook 1996, London 1996, ISBN 1856690806
- Vöge, Peter and Bab Westerveld, Stoelen, Nederlandse Ontwerpen 1945 – 1985, Amsterdam 1986, ISBN 9029081139
