= Dick Dankers =

Dutch furniture designer and gallery owner (1950 – 2018)

- Born: Hendricus Dankers; 22 April 1950; Amsterdam, Netherlands
- Died: 2 March 2018 (aged 67); Brazil
- Occupations: Furniture designer; gallery owner
- Awards: Dutch Furniture Award, 1990
- Website: rkd.nl

Hendricus "Dick" Dankers (22 April 1950 – 2 March 2018) was a Dutch furniture designer, and founder and gallery owner of The Frozen Fountain, located on the Prinsengracht in Amsterdam.

== Life and work ==
=== Youth and early years in interior design and sales ===
Dankers was born on 22 April 1950, in Amsterdam, and grew up in Rotterdam, where he completed the social academy after high school. After a world tour through America and Israel, he opened his first interior store in Amsterdam around 1975, focusing on vintage and art deco furniture.

In 1985, Dankers opened The Frozen Fountain interior store in the Utrechtsestraat in Amsterdam. He collaborated with young designers to show their work, and also designed carpets and furniture himself. In 1990, he won the Dutch Furniture Award with his own designed round chest of drawers .

=== The Frozen Fountain on the Prinsengracht ===
In 1992 in collaboration with Cok de Rooy they started The Frozen Fountain design gallery and moved to the Prinsengracht. The store offered a platform for starting designers such as Jurgen Bey, Piet Hein Eek, Hella Jongerius, Marcel Wanders, and Studio Job. He is remembered as "the man who brought the Netherlands to design."

In the first half of the 1990s, The Frozen Fountain organized several exhibitions with multiple design disciplines. There was a duo exhibition by Tejo Remy and Viktor & Rolf, and a duo exhibition by the theater group Alex d'Electrique and Henk Stallinga.

=== Death ===
Dankers drowned in the sea while visiting his daughter in Brazil.
