= Rotterdamse Kunststichting =

Former arts and culture foundation in the Netherlands

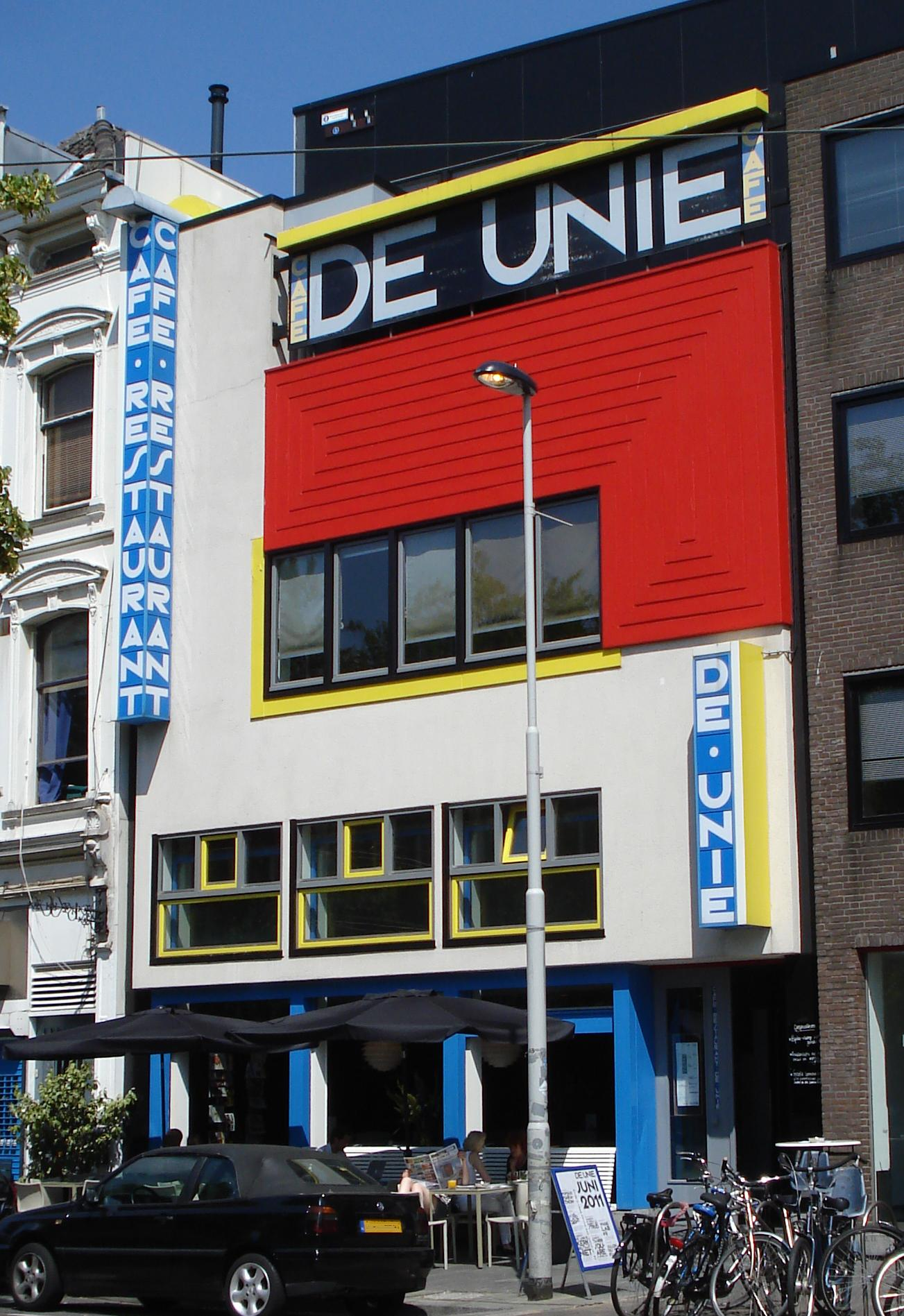
- The Rotterdamse Kunststichting has been located for years above Cafe De Unie on the Mauritsweg
- Location: Kunsthal Rotterdam; Museum Boijmans Van Beuningen
- Origins: From 1945 to 2005
- Region served: Rotterdam

The Rotterdamse Kunststichting RKS (Rotterdam Arts Council) was an independent foundation to promote art and culture in Rotterdam from 1945 to 2005. In 2005 the foundation merged into the Rotterdam Council for Art and Culture, an advisory body, while the other tasks were transferred to the Art and Culture department of the municipality of Rotterdam.

The foundation funded by the municipality had an advisory role towards the municipality and local art institutions, provided subsidies to institutions and projects, and developed initiatives of its own.

In its sixty years of existence, the foundation contributed to the reconstruction of the city, offered a base for Poetry International and the International Film Festival Rotterdam, and contributed to Rotterdam becoming the European Capital of Culture in 2001.

== History ==
=== Foundation ===
The Rotterdamse Kunststichting was founded in August 1945 to help promote the art climate in the city. The initiative was set in motion by The Hague policy officer Hendrik Jan Reinink (1901–1979), Secretary-General of the Ministry of Education, Arts and Sciences from 1945 to 1955.

Reinink wanted to take the financing of the arts outside of national and local government by establishing a national art institution with departments in all Dutch cities to manage and distribute the art subsidy locally. Partly due to the driving force of Eduard Reeser, such an institution was established in Rotterdam in a short period of time just after the war. In other cities there were similar intentions, which however didn't manage to get off the ground.

The Rotterdamse Kunststichting got its first board in 1946, with Willy Hofman as the first director. He was assigned a civil servant as secretary, who was as well responsible for the municipal art policy. The foundation at first took office in the city hall of Rotterdam. They moved their office to the Zoutmanstraat in 1953, due to the prompted desire to take a more independent course.

=== Early years ===
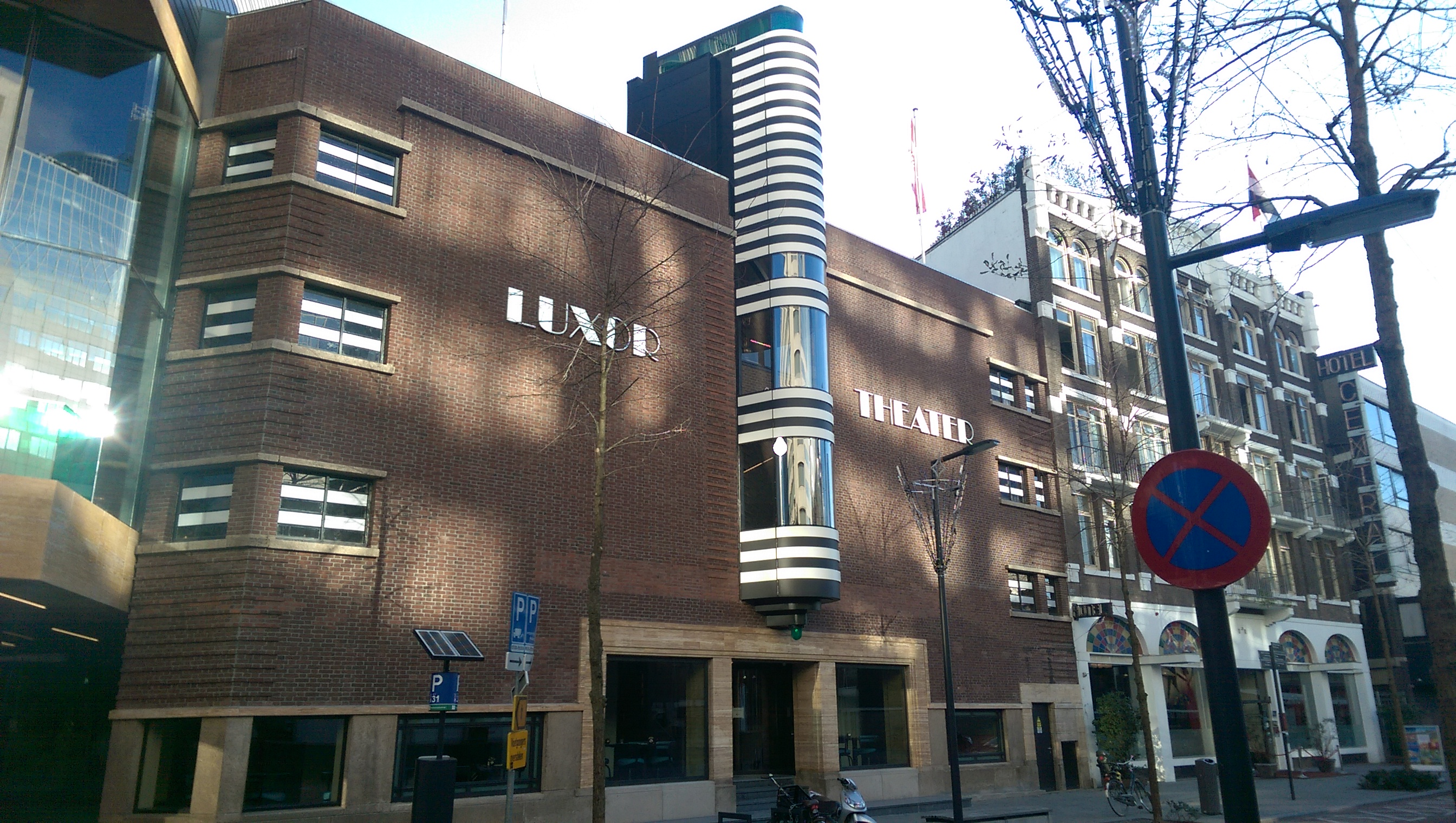
Luxor theater from 1918, converted in 1945 into a theater and film room.

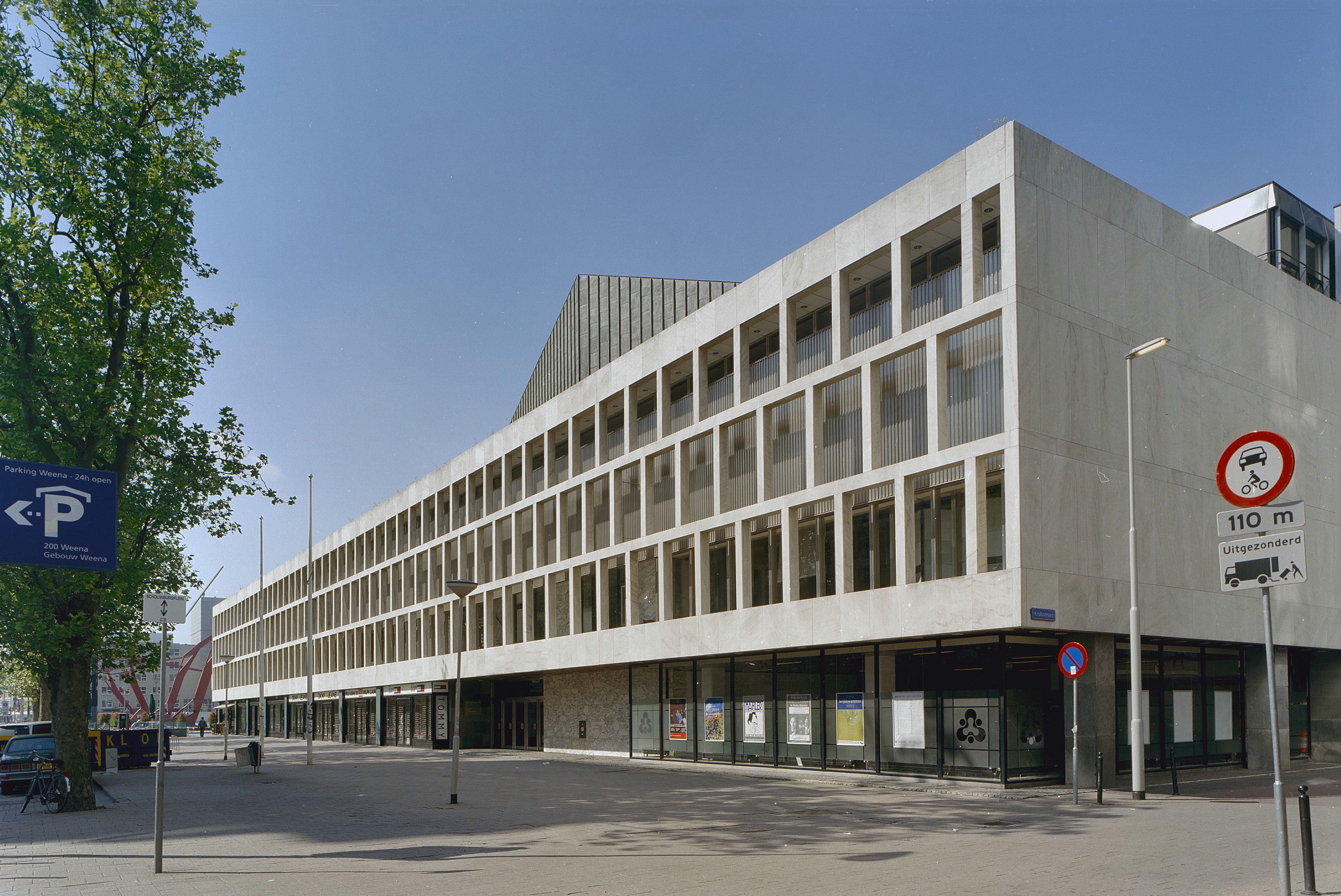
De Doelen concert and conference building since 1966.

In the early post-war years the foundation played an important role in the rebuilding of a cultural infrastructure of the city. To took control of restored and newly constructed buildings, such as the temporary Rotterdamse Schouwburg in 1948, the Ahoy hall in 1950, the avant-garde film theater 't Venster in 1953, and the De Lantaren theater in 1956. After their completion the buildings itself were transferred to the responsible municipal service, from 1966 the Municipal Art Buildings Department. The Rotterdamse Kunststichting took control of the operations of the various cultural institutions.

The Rotterdamse Kunststichting had also started an annual provision of commissions to artists at the municipal level. [2] A start was also made with the International Sculpture Collection, which would culminate in the Sculpture Route Westersingel. However, the years remained poor for Rotterdam, on the one hand, because a lot of cultural activity had left for Amsterdam. On the other hand, plans remained on the shelf due to lack of money, such as the idea of a central arts center suggested by Ludo Pieters, the then chairman of the Rotterdam Art Circle. From 1950 onwards, the tokens of the Rotterdamse Kunststichting became the medals of the Leuve, the Maze, the Rotte and the Merwe.

Since his appointment as director, Willy Hofman has been responsible for the Rotterdamse Schouwburg, the Luxor Theater and the municipal artists' studios. More theaters were managed under Hofman, including the Hofpleintheater, Piccolo Theater, De Doelen and the Zuidplein Theater. For programming, he came up with the so-called face philosophy, which meant that each theater had to radiate its own face or character. When Hofman became director of the new Municipal Art Buildings Department (DGK) in 1966, the management of the theater buildings was transferred there.

=== Poetry International ===
Adriaan van der Staay was appointed director in 1968. The following year, Van der Staay and Martin Mooij, head of the letter department, took the initiative to Poetry International. During a joint visit to the Poetry International Festival in London, they gained the necessary inspiration and contacts for a similar initiative in Rotterdam.

In the following year, the first Rotterdam Poetry International took place in the small hall of concert hall De Doelen. Twenty-three poets were guests, including the Polish Zbigniew Herbert, the French Eugène Guillevic and the Austrian Ernst Jandl. Among the guests in later years were Wole Soyinka, Seamus Heaney, Czesław Miłosz, Joseph Brodsky and Tomas Tranströmer.

=== Lijnbaancentrum ===
In 1970 the Lijnbaancentrum on the Korte Lijnbaan was opened on the initiative of the Rotterdamse Kunststichting with the support of the Art Foundation. This exhibition space was led by Felix Valk (1927–1999), head of exhibitions at the Art Foundation and the later director of the Museum of Ethnology in Rotterdam.

The Lijnbaan Center presented experimental exhibitions on a broad spectrum of art, image and mass culture, where it wanted to appeal to a wide audience. For example, Robin Page, the first-ever Fluxus artist, had an exhibition with his colonial humorous art there in early 1975, where he talked people in through a video message on the street.

=== Arts Lab De Lantaren ===
In 1970, the Rotterdamse Kunststichting opened an arts lab in the renovated theater Lantaarn with a graphic workshop and its own video studio led by Rommert Boonstra. It also had an exhibition space, organized courses, hosted the first Film International festival, came up with its own Perfo festival, and offered remarkable pop concerts.

The Hard Werken collective later emerged from the graphic workshop. In the video studio, video art was produced by artists such as Vito Acconci, Joan Jonas, Nan Hoover, Wim Gijzen and Jan van Munster. They received support from a video team from the Kunststichting, including Wink van Kempen. In 1984 the Lijnbaancentrum was closed due to budget cuts.

=== Film International ===
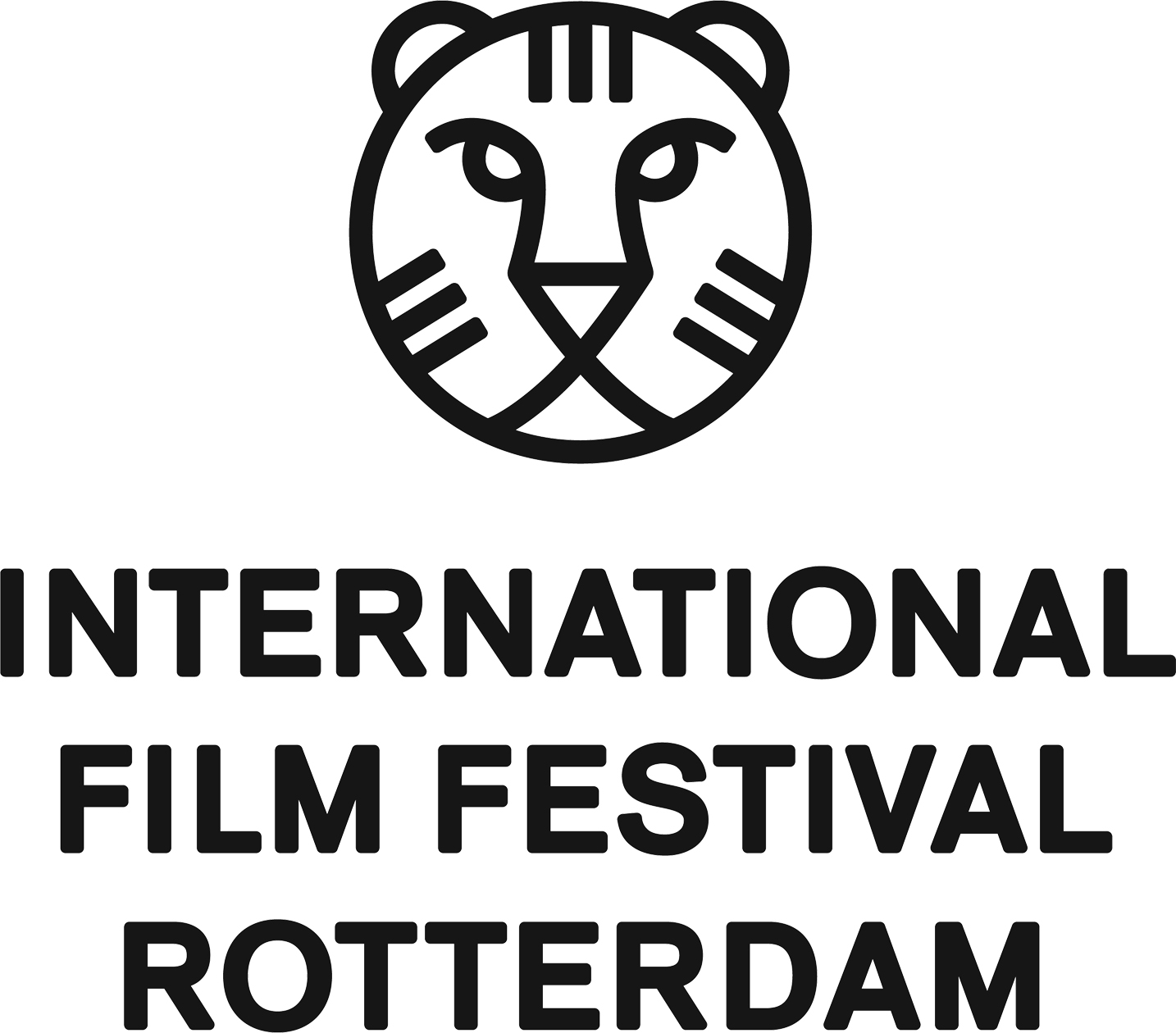
IFFR logo

The third initiative of the Rotterdamse Kunststichting under Adriaan van der Staay in the 1970s was the Film International festival, which was delegated to Huub Bals (1937–1988) to take the lead. Huub Bals wanted to show small, unknown films from all parts of the world at the festival. Personal and artistic films were preferred to commercial films from Hollywood.

The first Film International organized in 1972 from the Arts Lab De Lantaren and held in 't Venster and the Calypso cinema. In total, about 31 films were shown, which attracted a total of 5000 visitors. The name of the festival was changed into International Film Festival Rotterdam (IFFR), and has since been held annually in January.

=== Rotterdam Center for Visual Arts ===
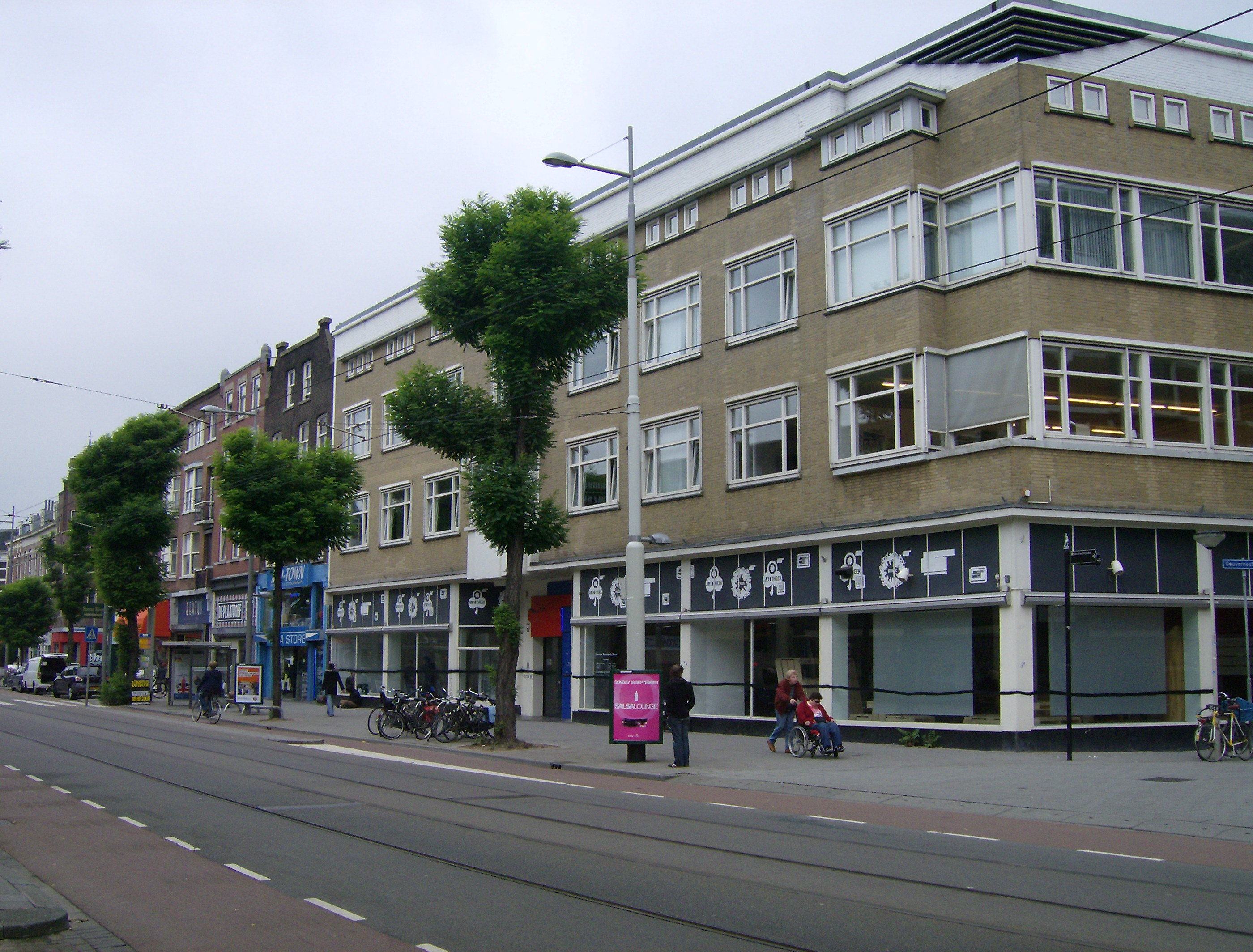
Center for Visual Arts

After the introduction of the Visual Artists Regulation (Beeldende Kunstenaars Regeling BKR) in 1945, a considerable collection of municipal art property had been collected over the years. In 1974 the Professional Association of Visual Artists (Beroepsvereniging van Beeldende Kunstenaars BBK) in Rotterdam proposed to make this collection available through an art library. With the help of the Rotterdamse Kunststichting, the Rijnmond Artotheek was opened on the Voorhaven in Delfshaven.

In the 1970s, the municipality started the Visual Arts Office (Bureau Beeldende Kunst), where individual artists could apply for grants. At the end of the 1970s, this service was merged with the Artotheek, and in 1982 moved to a corner building on the Nieuwe Binnenweg. Following the idea of the NRC Handelsblad art critic Dolf Welling (1919-2015) it was named the "Centrum Beeldende Kunst" (Center for Visual Arts), the first in the Netherlands. In addition to an exhibition space and art library, a documentation center was also set up. After 24 years, the location on the Nieuwe Binnenweg moved to the City Triangle in 2016.

=== Rotterdam Festivals ===
After 1945, large public events were regularly held in Rotterdam. That started with the Rotterdam Ahoy! exhibition in 1950. Subsequently, the National Energy Manifestation 1955, the Floriade 1960, and the manifestation "Communicatie 70" were organized. In the 1970s, the Rotterdamse Kunststichting had explicitly focused on internationalization and mass culture, which began in the field of poetry and films. In addition, festivals were established in the field of architecture, pop music and performance art.

A large-scale manifestation around the 650th anniversary of Rotterdam in 1990 was not a resounding success. It led in 1993 to the establishment of the Rotterdam Festivals knowledge center, which was to coordinate festivals and events. It was laid down in a festival formula that festivals to be organized should contribute to strengthening the identity and profile of the city and to its economic development. In addition, they should encourage collaboration between the Rotterdam art institutions. Rotterdam Festivals was set up as a knowledge center to coordinate festivals and events in Rotterdam.

=== Exhibitions and publications ===
Over the years the Rotterdamse Kunststichting participated in numerous art and design publications. They published books on artists and designers such as Homero Aridjis, Toeti Heraty, Ajip Rosidi and Lotte Stam-Beese.

In 1990 in cooperation with Museum Boijmans Van Beuningen and the Centrum Beeldende Kunst Rotterdam (CBK) they created the exhibition Rotterdam Assorti in the former Holland America Line head office, now Hotel New York. The exhibition was curated by Jan van Adrichem for Boymans, Ove Lucas for the CBK, and Thomas Meyer zu Schlochtern for the RKS. In 1993 Thomas Meyer for the RKS curated the exhibition Verwantschaften in the Rotterdam Kunsthal.

In 1996 the Rotterdam Arts Council offered a shelter for the first European Manifesta exhibition in Rotterdam, which had been set to happen in Nicosia, Cyprus.

=== Rotterdam Design Awards ===
In 1993 the Rotterdamse Kunststichting initiated the Rotterdam Design Award with Christine de Baan as its founding director. It was presented as the most important prize for Dutch design and designers in the Netherlands.

From a few hundred applications about forty designs and designers were nominated, from which a jury choose one winner and about five recommendation. The nominees were exhibited at the Kunsthal Rotterdam, where at the end of the exhibition the prize was awarded.

=== Aftermaths ===
The last director was Robert R. de Haas, previously director of the Rijksdienst Beeldende Kunst (RBK). Under his rule, Rotterdam became the European Capital of Culture in 2001. In addition, he has encouraged new developments for dance in the city. Among other things, he established the HipHopHuis in Rotterdam.

In 2003 a broad restructuring operation started in the Rotterdam sector of art and culture. A number of municipal activities in that area were privatized. And a new Art and Culture Service and a Rotterdam Council for Art and Culture were initiated.

=== Rotterdam Council for Art and Culture ===
On 7 June 2005, the municipality of Rotterdam established the Rotterdam Council for Art and Culture as a new official advisory body. The Rotterdamse Kunststichting was thereby maintained as an independent legal entity and employer for the people of the office of the Rotterdam Council for Art and Culture. The management and distribution of arts subsidies, a task that the Rotterdamse Kunststichting had taken care of for 60 years, was transferred to the Art and Culture department of the municipality of Rotterdam.

== Organization ==
Over the years, the directors of the Rotterdamse Kunststichting have each left their mark on the foundation and the course to be sailed. In total there have been the following six directors:

- 1945–1966: Willy Hofman
- 1968–1978: Adriaan van der Staay
- 1979–1982: Hans Keller
- 1982–1990: Paul Noorman
- 1990–1995: Alle Diderik the Younger
- 1995–2005: Robert R. de Haas

In the independent foundation, the director was accountable to the board. This board consisted of a broad mix of people from business, politics and the cultural sector. The first chairman of the board of the Rotterdamse Kunststichting in 1945 was Cees van der Leeuw. Later presidents were Ludo Pieters until the 1980s, who previously as chairman of the Rotterdam art circle had been a regular member of the board, and George Brouwer from 1999 to 2012. Another prominent board member was J.C. Ebbinge Wubben, who from 1945 to 1978 was director of Museum Boijmans Van Beuningen.

With the start of the Rotterdam Council for Art and Culture it held fifteen members under the chairmanship of Micky Teenstra-Verhaar.

== See also ==
- Rotterdam Design Award
