= Rotterdam Design Award =

Dutch award for design

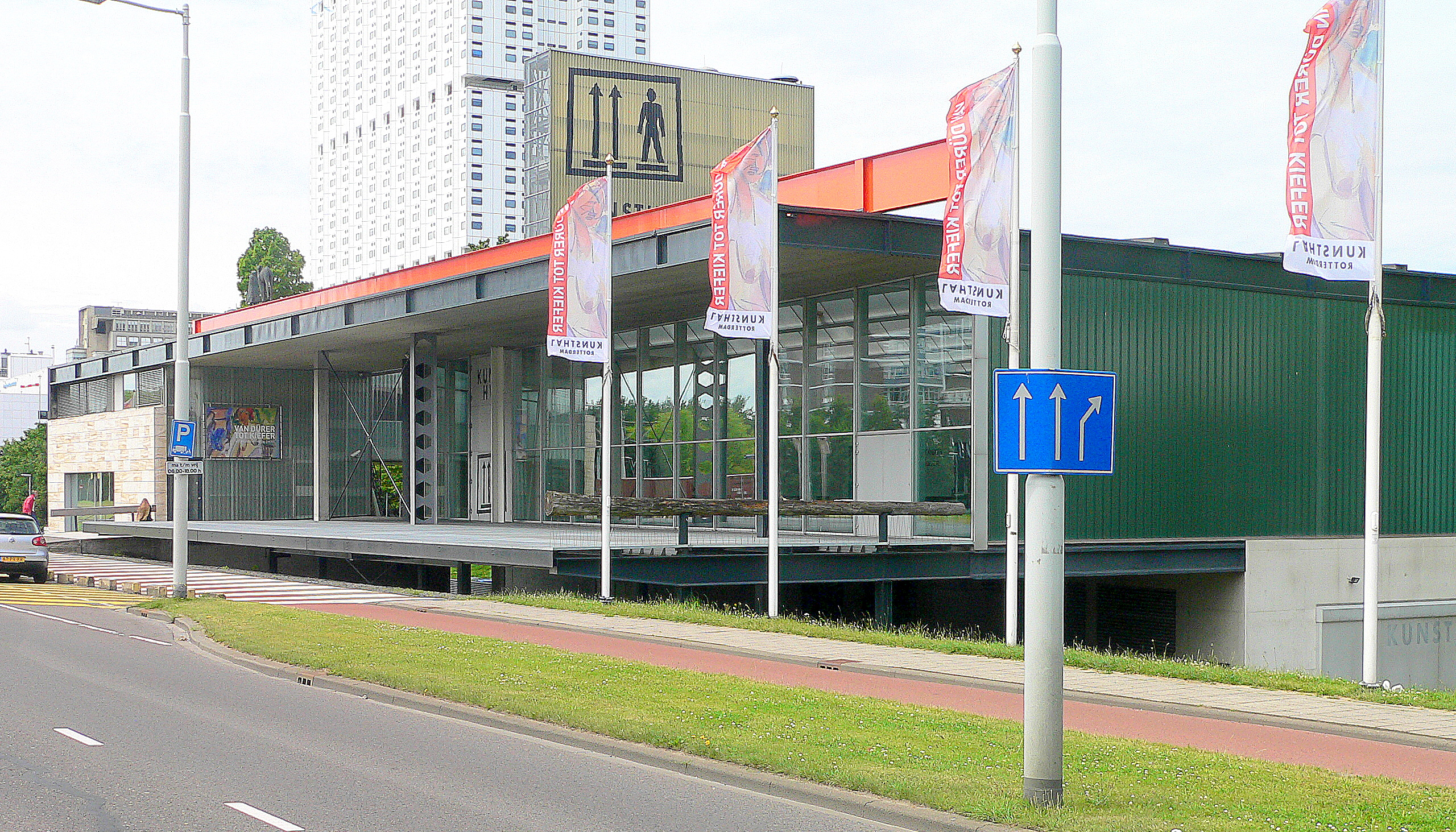
- Kunsthal Rotterdam, location of the first exhibitions and ceremonies
- Location: Kunsthal Rotterdam; Museum Boijmans Van Beuningen
- Origins: Held from 1993 to 2013
- Region served: The Netherlands
- Key people: Christine de Baan (first director); Rotterdamse Kunststichting

The Rotterdam Design Award (Rotterdamse Designprijs) was an annual and later biennial design award in the Netherlands from 1993 to 2013. In the first five editions the work of the nominees were exhibited in the Kunsthal, and afterwards in Museum Boijmans Van Beuningen. The winners were selected by an international jury during this exhibition, and were announced at the end of the exhibition. The winners received an amount of €20,000, which could be spent freely.

== History ==
The prize was organized annually from 1993 to 1997, after which it became a biennial prize. No edition took place in 2005.

In the first years the prize was awarded to individual products of designers, architects and other participants in the field of design. Since 2007 the conceptual vision and performance in the field of the designer became its major criterion.

The awarded was inaugurated by the Rotterdamse Kunststichting, where Christine de Baan was director of the Rotterdam Design Prize from 1993 tot 2000. In 2007, Thimo te Duits & Gerard Forde managed the award and wrote the catalog. Towards the end in 2011 the Rotterdam design prize was organized by Stichting Designprijs Rotterdam, Museum Boijmans Van Beuningen and Premsela, Dutch Institute for Design and Fashion.

== Award winners 1993–2013 ==
Jaar	Winnaar juryprijs	Eervolle vermeldingen	Winnaar publieksprijs	Juryleden
1993	Roelof Mulder	Marijke Bruggink, Marlie Witteveen, Hans Kappetein; Herman Hermsen; Roelof Mulder; Frans van Nieuwenborg; ninaber/peters/krouwel	(geen)	Wim Crouwel, chairman; Sebastien de Diesbach; Denis Santachiara; Deyan Sudjic
1994	Diek Zweegman; BRS Premsela Vonk	Anthon Beeke; Nel Linssen; Bureau Mijksenaar; Frans Oosterhof; Maarten Struijs	Pieter van Gendt	Wim Crouwel (chairman); Peter Dormer; Denis Santachiara; Tucker Viemeister
1995	Jan Erik Baars, Caroline Brouwer; Jan Paul van der Voet; Philips Corporate Design	Huibert Groenendijk; Ruud-Jan Kokke; Karel Martens; Lola Pagola; Erik Terlouw	Max Kisman	Wim Crouwel (chairman); Alfredo Arribas; Peter Dormer; April Greiman
1996	Bob van Dijk/Studio Dumbar	Arian Brekveld; Opera ontwerpers i.s.m. Le Cri Néerlandais; Peter van der Veer, Thomas Paulen & Martijn Wegman; Jan Velthuizen, Ronald Wall	Edouard Boehtlingk	John Thackara (chairman); Paola Antonelli; Alfredo Arribas; Rick Poynor
1997	Maatschappij voor Oude en Nieuwe Media	Jeroen Vinken for 'Twinn' vloerbekleding; Jan Konings and Jurgen Bey for 'Straatmeubilair informatiepunt Barsingerhorn'; Willem van Zoetendaal, Koos Breukel and Michael Matthews for 'Hyde' book; Rens Holslag, Hans Rijpkema, Pieter Rookmaker, Leonard Verhoef and Jochen Vorderegger for 'ETCS MMI' interface for train drivers'; Irma Boom for 'SHV-book'	Marcel Wanders forh 'Knotted Chair'	John Thackara (chairman); Helen Drutt English; Ingo Maurer; Rick Poynor
1999	NL Architects Pieter Bannenberg, Walter van Dijk, Kamiel Klaase and Mark Linneman) for heat transfer station	Zwarts & Jansma Architecten en Hans Muller for KW 4–20 underpass at highway A4 near Leidschendam	Erik Jan Kwakkel, Peter van de Jagt; Arnout Visser with 'Functional Tiles'	John Thackara (chairman); Karrie Jacobs; Sarah Lerfel; Peter Noever
2001	Jop van Bennekom and Erik Wong for the design the Forum magazine	?	?	Miuccia Prada; Bruce Mau; Olivier Zahm; Gert Staal
2003	Hella Jongerius for fabric 'Repeat'	Archis (tijdschrift)	?	Ineke Schwartz (chairman); Hans-Ulrich Obrist; Ellen Lupton; Konstantin Grcic
2007	Thonik	?	?	Bas Heijne (chairman); Fernando Brizio; Didier Krzentowski; Gareth Williams
2009	Studio Joost Grootens	?	Gorilla	Peter van Ingen (voorzitter); ?
2011	Rietveld Landscape	?	Vlaamsch Broodhuys	Fredric Baas (chairman); Susan Szenasy; Sebastian Wrong; Lars Müller
2013	Reframing Studio and Parnassia; Groep for 'temstem’ app		Edenspiekermann, ProRail, STBY; NS Reizigers for Dynamic boarding data at the platform	Max Bruinsma (chairman); Caroline Baumann; Edwin Heathcote; Virginia Tassinari

== бSee also ==
- Dutch Design Awards
- Dutch Furniture Awards

== Selected publications ==
- Thimo te Duits & Gerard Forde, Designprijs Rotterdam 2007, Rotterdam : Stichting Designprijs, 2007.
