= Christine de Baan =

Dutch art curator

- Born: 10 October 1956 (age 69); Oxford, England
- Education: Leiden University; Willem de Kooning Academy
- Occupations: Art historian,; art
- Years active: Since 1985
- Known for: Rotterdam Design Award (founding director)
- Parent(s): Piet de Baan (2-3-1923/13-10-1960), Frances Deane Jones

Christine de Baan (born 10 October 1956) is a Dutch art curator, policy advisor and director, known for numerous contributions in the field of Dutch Design. She participated in the organisation of the Prix de Rome, the Rotterdamse Kunststichting where she was founding director of the Rotterdam Design Award in 1993, the Fonds BKVB, and the International Architecture Biennal Rotterdam.

== Biography ==
=== Studies and early career ===
De Baan studied French at the Leiden University from 1975 to 1977, and architectural design at the Willem de Kooning Academy from 1979 to 1986. In the last year she started working together with the designer Ed Annink.

After her studies in 1987 De Baan, Renny Ramakers and Ed Annink founded the Foundation Products of Imagination, which initiated and organized multiple design projects and publications. In 1989 she created an exhibition in the Jaarbeurs about the 150 year of Dutch railroads and the romances, that had taken place there.

De Baan participated in the organisation of the Prix de Rome from 1990 to early 1993, and edited some of its publications. Early 1993 she joined the Rotterdamse Kunststichting, where she was founding director of the Rotterdam Design Award, which she managed the next six or seven years.

=== Later career ===
In the new millennium De Baan joined the Fonds BKVB, later the Mondrian Fund, where she chaired the advisory board of the national funding for art and design for four years. She was program director of the International Architecture Biennal Rotterdam from 2006 to 2008. From 2008 until 2013 she was director of DutchDFA, the Dutch design Dutch Design, Fashion and Architecture.

Afterwards De Baan continued a program director, advisor and/or lecturer nationally and international form Dublin, to Cape Town and Beijing. In Arnhem she was advisor for the Arnhem Fashion Biennale in 2014-15 and directed the Sonsbeek and State of fashion foundation in Arnhem for a year.

== Work ==
=== Products of Imagination ===
Around 1985 De Baan had started cooperating with the designer Ed Annink to research the state of the design and young designers in the Netherlands. Ed van Hinte explained:

Along with Christine de Baan, Ed Annink went in search of the nameless generation of new designers of the late 1980s. Together they travelled all over the country talking to young designers about their dreams and ideas. They looked at the work and tried to ascertain its quality. There were real gems amongst that work, but more often it was arty-farty stuff with nothing Annink could discern to connect it with reality 'cottage craft', which seemed to attract museums more than anyone else. Only later would he speak out more explicitly on economy of design, but in fact the seeds of his interest in industrial design had already been sown during this round trip of the Netherlands. Yet in the final selection of works it was the cultural significance above all that resonated in the products. And it was on that basis, as others also remember, that discussions took place.

A similar research in those days had been performed by Renny Ramakers for a series of her articles in de Volkskrant. The three of them decided to join forces to promote the new wave of ideas of those Dutch designer. They started a foundation in 1987, and named it "Products of Imagination," abbreviated POI or P.O.I. Their cooperation resulted in the publication of a book under the same name, and the organization of multiple design exhibitions.

=== DutchDFA ===
In 2013 the DutchDFA came to an ending, and its funding tasks merged into the Stimulation fund for the Creative Industry (Stimuleringsfonds voor de Creatieve Industrie).

== Selected publications ==
- Ed Annink, Christine de Baan, Renny Ramakers. Products of Imagination, The Dutch Experiment in Design. 1987.
- Christine de Baan, 1991 Prix de Rome: fotografie, Museum Fodor (Amsterdam, Netherlands), Nederlands Filmmuseum, 1991.
- Baan, Christine de, Prix de Rome 1992 : beeldhouwen/beeldende kunst en openbaarheid = sculpture/art in the open, Uitgeverij 010, 1992.
- Christine de Baan ed. Designprijs Rotterdam 1994, Amsterdam: Uitgeverij BIS, 1994.
- Baan, Christine de, The flood : 2nd International Architecture Biennale Rotterdam : catalogue = catalogus, International Architecture Biennale Rotterdam, 2005
- Baan, Christine de, De Hollandse waterstad = Water cities, 2005.
- Baan, Christine de, Visionary power : producing the contemporary city, NAi Publishers, 2007.
