= Dutch Furniture Awards =

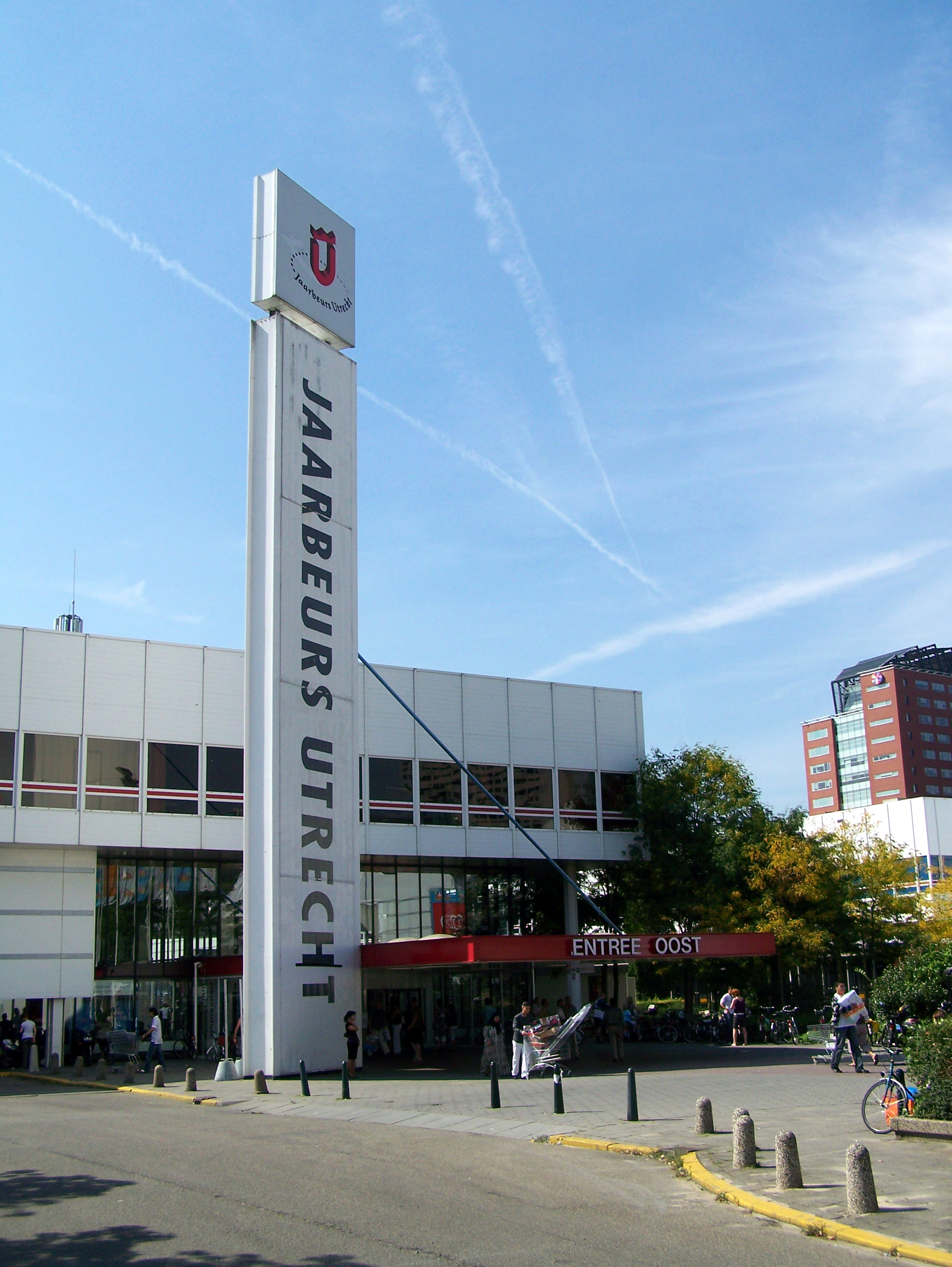
- Jaarbeurs Utrecht, location of the Dutch Furniture Awards exhibition and ceremony
- Location: Jaarbeurs Utrecht
- Origins: Held from 1985 to 1998
- Region served: The Netherlands
- Key people: Vereniging van Vakbeurs Meubel (VVM)

The Dutch Furniture Awards is a former annual furniture design competition in the Netherlands, organized from 1985 to 1998. This was an initiative of the Jaarbeurs Utrecht and the Vereniging van Vakbeurs Meubel (VVM).

== Overview ==
This design prize was awarded annually. In 1985 it started with three prices for furniture designs: the Award for the best Dutch furniture design, the Style prize, and the Furniture of the year. In the following year a fourth prize was introduced, the Prize for Young Designers. In recent years, the Style for Industrial Product Quality replaced the style prize.

In addition to a main prize, each category has already been awarded one or more honorable mentions each year. Also, with some regularity, a grand prize was not awarded in a certain category if the jury felt that the product quality in that particular category had not been sufficient that year.

The entries of the Dutch Furniture Awards were exhibited annually. This was for a longer time at an annual International Furniture Fair in the Utrecht Fair. In 1997 this was at the Kunsthal Rotterdam, and at the Woonbeurs in the Prins Bernhardhoeve in Zuidlaren. In 1998 the ceremony took place in the Naardense Promerskazerne. The last presentation in 1999 took place again in the Jaarbeurs during the Interdecor home exhibition in Utrecht.

== The jury ==
The jury usually consisted of three people per category with a well-known designer and a furniture manufacturer, regularly supplemented by past prize winners. Known permanent judges were Sem Aardewerk, Willem van Ast, Gerard van den Berg, Jan des Bouvrie, Rob Eckhardt, Ton Haas and Jan Pesman.

Other jury members included Thijs Asselbergs in 1985, and Karel Boonzaaijer

== Award winners 1985-1999 ==
Year	Award for best Dutch furniture design	Style price and more	Furniture of the year	Prize for young designers
1985	Chair 'Antilope', designers Karel Boonzaaijer and Pierre Mazairac, manufacturer Katinova	Not assigned	Chair 'DES 2021', designer Gerard van den Berg, manufacturer Rohe Design	Not applicable
1986	Not granted	Secretary desk, designer Theo Salet, manufacturer Kreos	Chair 'Turner', designer Jack Crebolder, manufacturer Dover Design	Chaise longue, designer Annelies de Leede
1987	Seating element 'Pouffe garni' by designer Rob Eckhardt, manufacturer UMS-pastoe	Armchair 'Gina', designer Bep van Mourik, manufacturer HF-style	3-seat couch 'Cobra', designer Jack Crebolder, manufacturer Dover Design	Table with glass top, designer Ron Hermes, manufacturer Hennie de Jong
1988	Folding table 'Volante'; designer Peter Schreuder Goedheijt, manufacturer Hennie de Jong	Chair 'Bulusari-Sat 1-1', designer Henk de Vlies, manufacturer Modular systems	Bed 'Chailenge', designer Martin Haksteen, manufacturer Luimes & Wiggers	'Divi-divi 890', designer Mark van Tilburg
1989	Armchair 'Pallone 001', designer Roy de Scheepmaker, manufacturer Leolux	Desk, design and manufacturer Jan Malschaert: Price for Dutch classic furniture: not awarded in 1989	Glass chair 'Xinix', design Theo Valk, manufacturer design: Honorable mention for Boris van Koert for his set of banks 'Tulip 3'	Cocktail cupboard 'Diavolo in corpo', designer Erikjan Roodbol: Honorable mention for room screen
1990	Seating furniture 'Disk', designer Pieter de Moor, manufacturer PM-Design: Honorable Mention armchair '5470 F', designer Jan des Bouvrie	Armchair '5470 F', designer Jan des Bouvrie, manufacturer Meubelindustrie Gelderland: Price for the Dutch classic furniture: cabinet drawer 'Column', design Dick Dankers, manufacturer the Frozen Fountain	Hit the road, designer William Brand: Honorable mention Wim Bertram, movable work/meeting table 'Spinning Image'	Point closet; designer Margo Bockting
1991	Wall table 'Dakota', designer Jan Harm ter Brugge, manufacturer J.H. ter Brugge Design	Wall table 'Dakota', designer Jan Harm ter Brugge, manufacturer J.H. ter Brugge Design: Price for the Dutch classic furniture: dining Chair '9017 B', designer and manufacturer Hans van 't Leven	Children's cot 'Mels box', designer Yko Buursma. Manufacturer Yko Buursma	Table 'Gwydion', designer Jan Willem Vroom
1992	Not granted	Show case closet system 'Morph', designer Barro de Gast: Price for the Dutch classic furniture: cabinet "Twist'n", designer Theo Salet, manufacturer Theo Salet Furniture design	Sitting and sleeping furniture '4-Play', designer Eric Djie, manufacturer Djie	Chair (without name) designer Hugo Timmermans
1993	Orange cabinet, designer and manufacturer Hugo Timmermans, manufacturer Hugo Timmermans	Extra table, designer Huub Looze: Price for Dutch classic furniture: Demolition wood cabinet, designer and manufacturer Piet Hein Eek	Chair 'Welcome', designer Gerrit Schilder jr.	'Cradle nr xx', designer Peter Bedner
1994	Not granted: Honorable mention: seat 'Seasons' by Ulf Moritz and manufacturer Montis	Chair 'Toto' by Ellen Janssen: Honorable mention: chair 'Zodiac' by Rik Tuithof; Price for industrial product quality: chair 'Toto' by Ellen Janssen: Honorable mention the 'Cross Closet' of Hugo Timmermans; Honorable mention the lighting ornament 'La Mosca light' by Marcel Douwe Dekker; Price for Dutch furniture design for foreign manufacturers: not awarded	Not applicable	Pulpit 'Lectern', designer Titus Hertzberger: Honorable mention: chair 'Toto' by Ellen Janssen
1995	Table 'H10', designer and manufacturer Ben Hoek	Not applicable	Folding chair 'The four scissors', designer Marco Arwert	Box, Remke Brouwer
1996	Hanging bookcase, designer and manufacturer Ben Hoek	Not applicable Price for industrial product quality: a leaning cupboard by Marjolijn van Puffelen: Honorable mention: pendant lamp by Ajo Smedema	Not applicable	Kirk Tijl for table 'Alive': Honorable mention: Kirk Tijl for portable seat 'Cling'.
1997	Armchair 'BOBO', designer Gerard van den Berg	Fluent design desk, designer Richard Hutten Price for industrial product quality: Thijs Korpershoek for first aid kit	Not applicable	Chris Slutter for wall lamp
1998	Armchair 'Lotus', designer René Holten: Honorable mention coffee table 'Pebbles' by Marc Leeflang and Bint	Not applicable Price for industrial product quality: Martijn Ritzema for lamp 'Wiep'	Not applicable	Martijn Prins with Link, a switchable element for a bookcase: Honorable mentions: Bar stool by Muriel Appel; Honorable mention for table and screen by Rob Sprang
1999	Cube-like bench, designer Jan des Bouvrie, manufacturer Gelderland: Honorable mention laundry basket with drying rack 'Butterfly' by Sven Schimmen (manufacturer: Made by Humans); Honorable mention for a laundry basket with drying rack and a standing lamp.	Not applicable Price for industrial product quality: not awarded: Honorable mention for the stool 'Dreibein' by Simon Barteling.	Not applicable	Bob Copray and Stephan Scholten with their Project Unit. Shared with: Harm de Klein for his 'folding chair'

== See also ==
- Dutch Design
- Dutch Design Awards
- Dutch design week
- Rotterdam Design Award
