= Mienke Simon Thomas =

Dutch art historian, curator and author

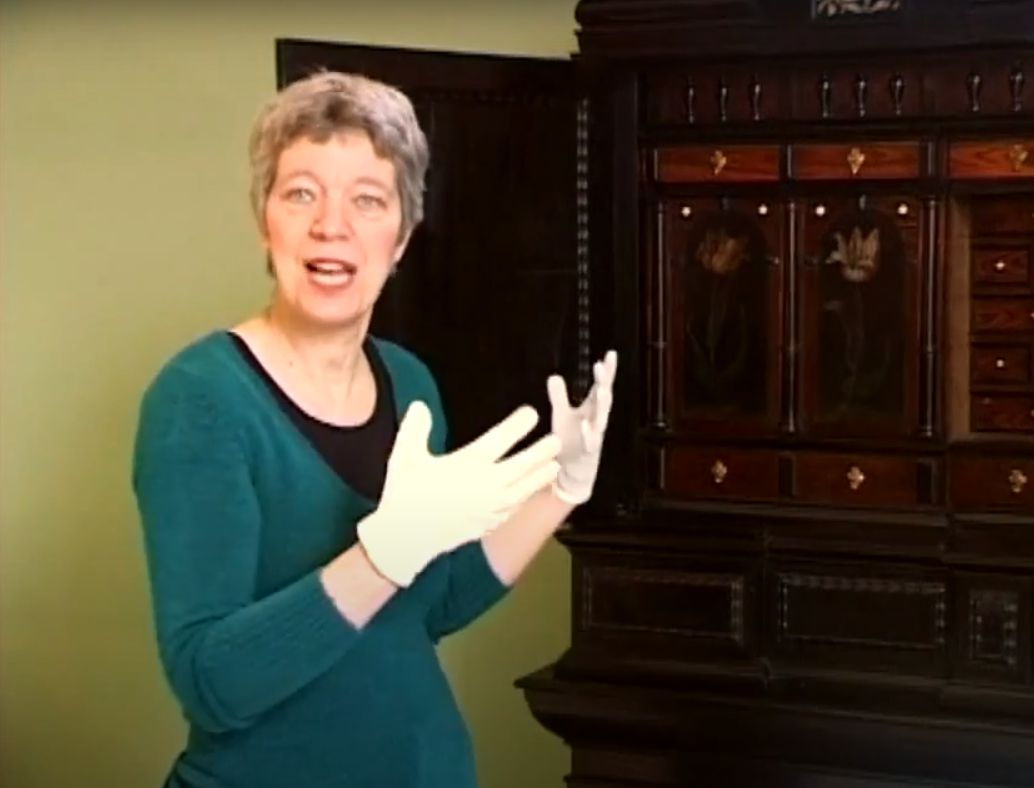
- Curator's Choice; Mienke Simon Thomas shows Doomer's Collector's Cabinet, 2014.
- Born: Margaretha Wilhelmina Francina Simon Thomas; 1954 (age 71–72)
- Occupations: Art historian; curator; author
- Years active: Since 1976
- Known for: Dutch Design: A History (2008)

Margaretha Wilhelmina Francina (Mienke) Simon Thomas (born 1954) is a Dutch art historian, curator and author, working as a senior curator at Museum Boijmans Van Beuningen in Rotterdam. She is known for her works on the development of Dutch applied art and design.

== Life and work ==
Simon Thomas studied at the Design Academy Eindhoven from 1972 to 1976, and continued for some time in the history of art and design at Utrecht University. Later in 1996 she obtained her PhD in this direction at the Vrije Universiteit Amsterdam under Carel Blotkamp with a dissertation on ornaments and ornament theories in the Netherlands between 1850 and 1930.

At the end of the seventies Simon Thomas started as a freelancer. She participated in the Industry & Design exhibition at the Stedelijk Museum in Amsterdam from 1985 to 1986. in 1986 she published a book about the furniture designer Cornelis van der Sluys.

In 1993 Simon Thomas started as a curator at Museum Boijmans van Beuningen, where she grew to be the main curator as successor of Thimo te Duits. She then continued to write about Dutch design and its development. For example, she wrote general books about the Dutch packaging industry, Art Deco in the Netherlands, and some biographical works about designers such as Jaap Gidding, Jacob Jongert and Johan Thorn Prikker.

== Selected publications ==
- Mienke Simon Thomas. Corn. van der Sluys: binnenhuisarchitect, organisator en publicist, 1881/1944. Uitgeverij 010, 1988.
- Mienke Simon Thomas. De Leer van het Ornament. Versieren volgens voorschrift 1850 – 1930. proefschrift Vrije Universiteit in Amsterdam, 1996.
- Mienke Simon Thomas. Goed in vorm: honderd jaar ontwerpen in Nederland, 010 Publishers, 2008.
- Mienke Simon Thomas.Dutch Design: A history, Reaktion Books, 15 December 2008
