= Thimo te Duits =

Dutch art historian (born 1962)

- Born: Thimo G. te Duits; 1962 (age 63–64); Utrecht
- Occupations: Art historian,; art curator
- Years active: Since 1980s

Thimo te Duits (born 1962 in Utrecht) is a Dutch art historian, curator, author and editor, known for his numerous contributions in the field of Dutch applied art.

== Biography ==
=== Early career in the 1980s and 1990s ===
After his studies in art history, Te Duits started his career as freelance curator for the Haags Gemeentemuseum, now Kunstmuseum Den Haag. In 1986, he curated and wrote the catalog on an exhibition about glass art from abroad.

In 1990 a widespread exhibition took place of modern ceramics in the Netherlands with over 70 ceramists in 21 places, among others in the museums of Delft, The Hague and Rotterdam. Te Duits wrote the catalog for this exhibition. In 1991 Te Duits curated an exhibition on Leen Quist in the Museum Boijmans van Beuningen.

The same year Te Duits got associated with the Leerdam Glasmuseum, now Nationaal Glasmuseum, where he wrote an exhibition catalog on pressed glass from Leerdam. When early 1992 the old curator of the museum retired, he was appointed in his place. In the next years he initiated some remarkable exhibitions out there.

=== Later career in the new millennium ===
In 1996 Te Duits had moved to Rotterdam, where he was appointed new curator of the modern applied art section of the Museum Boijmans Van Beuningen. In the next years out there he curated a number of special exhibitions. In Boymans he was succeeded by Mienke Simon Thomas.

In 2006 Te Duits contributed to the Phaidon Design Classics. The next year he curated and wrote the book on the 2007 Rotterdam Design Award together with Gerard Forde. In 2010 te Duits wrote another book about Olaf Stevens (1948–) and Studio Olaf Stevens, a glass art and ceramics studio in Gorinchem. He wrote this work with Piet Augustijn, who with Brinkman had run a gallery at the Gorinchem city hall from 1994 that would last until 2019.

== Selected publications ==
- T.G. te Duits. Glas van buiten de grenzen, 's-Gravenhage : Nijgh & van Ditmar 1986.
- Thimo te Duits. Moderne Keramiek in Nederland / Modern Ceramics in the Netherlands, Den Haag, 1990.
- Thimo te Duits, Geperst glas uit Leerdam, Leerdam : Glasmuseum, 1991.
- Duits, Thimo te. De noordelijke traditie : Leen Quist, keramiek & De keramiekcollectie Koster en Quist = The Northern tradition : Leen Quist, ceramics & The Koster and Quist ceramics collection. Museum Boymans-van Beuningen, 1993.
- T.G. te Duits & Gerard Forde, Designprijs Rotterdam 2007, Rotterdam : Stichting Designprijs, 2007.
- T.G. te Duits & Piet Augustijn. Studio Olaf Stevens/Drie werelden : porselein, glas & dessins. Gorinchem : Gorcums Museum, 2010.
