= Thomas Meyer zu Schlochtern =

Dutch art historian and curator (born 1946)

Thomas Meyer
- Born: Thomas Meyer zu Schlochtern; 1946 (age 79–80); Amsterdam
- Occupations: Art historian; curator; author
- Years active: Since 1977
- Known for: Director of Arti et Amicitiae, Curator at Rotterdamse Kunststichting and TENT Rotterdam

Thomas Meyer zu Schlochtern (born 1946) is a Dutch art historian and curator, who came into prominence as director of the Arti et Amicitiae and as curator at Rotterdamse Kunststichting in the 1990s.

== Biography ==
=== Education and early career ===
Born in Amsterdam in 1946, Meyer studied art at the Gerrit Rietveld Academie in Amsterdam and the Ateliers '63 from 1968 to 1972. From 1972 to 1974 he studied another two years art history, criticism and conservation at the KU Leuven.

In 1977 Meyer started as staff member (Education) at the Van Abbemuseum. In 1980 he was one of the founders of the artists' initiative De Fabriek in Eindhoven. In 1986 Meyer was assistant director of the International Sculpture Exhibition Sonsbeek 86 Arnhem. In 1987 he was appointed director of Arti et Amicitiae. In 1990 he moved to the Rotterdamse Kunststichting RKS (Arts Council Rotterdam). That year with Jan van Adrichem for Boymans and Ove Lucas for the CBK Rotterdam they curated the exhibition in the former Holland America Line head office, now Hotel New York, called Rotterdam Assorti.

In 1993 Meyer for the RKS curated the exhibition Verwantschaften in the Rotterdam Kunsthal. In 1996 he coordinated for the RKS the first European Manifesta exhibition in Rotterdam.

=== Later career ===
From 1999 to 2006 Meyer was manager and curator at TENT Rotterdam for the Centrum Beeldende Kunst Rotterdam (CBK), and another five years he was curator of international projects for the CBK, such as Paramaribo SPAN with Surinam.

After another year (2010 to 2011) Meyer was advisor for the André Volten Foundation, and then he continued as freelance curator, researcher and writer.

Among others Meyer lectured about contemporary German painters as Penck, Immendorff, Kiefer, Lüpertz, Baselitz. He interviewed deviant artist Reynaldo Chirino for a project by Bik Van Der Pol. He was among the first to participate in the Artist in the World project by André Smits. In 2014 he published a book about Yubi Kirindongo, a rebellious artist from Curaçao.

== Selected publications ==
- Thomas Meyer zu Schlochtern. Brieven van Arti et Amicitiae, Amsterdam geschreven door ... - Volume 5. 1984.
- Thomas Meyer zu Schlochtern. Confrontaciones, 1988.
- Thomas Meyer zu Schlochtern. Kirindongo, Yubi. Rebel in de kunst, Stichting LM publishers: Arnhem, 2014.
