= Renny Ramakers =

Dutch art historian, curator, and critic

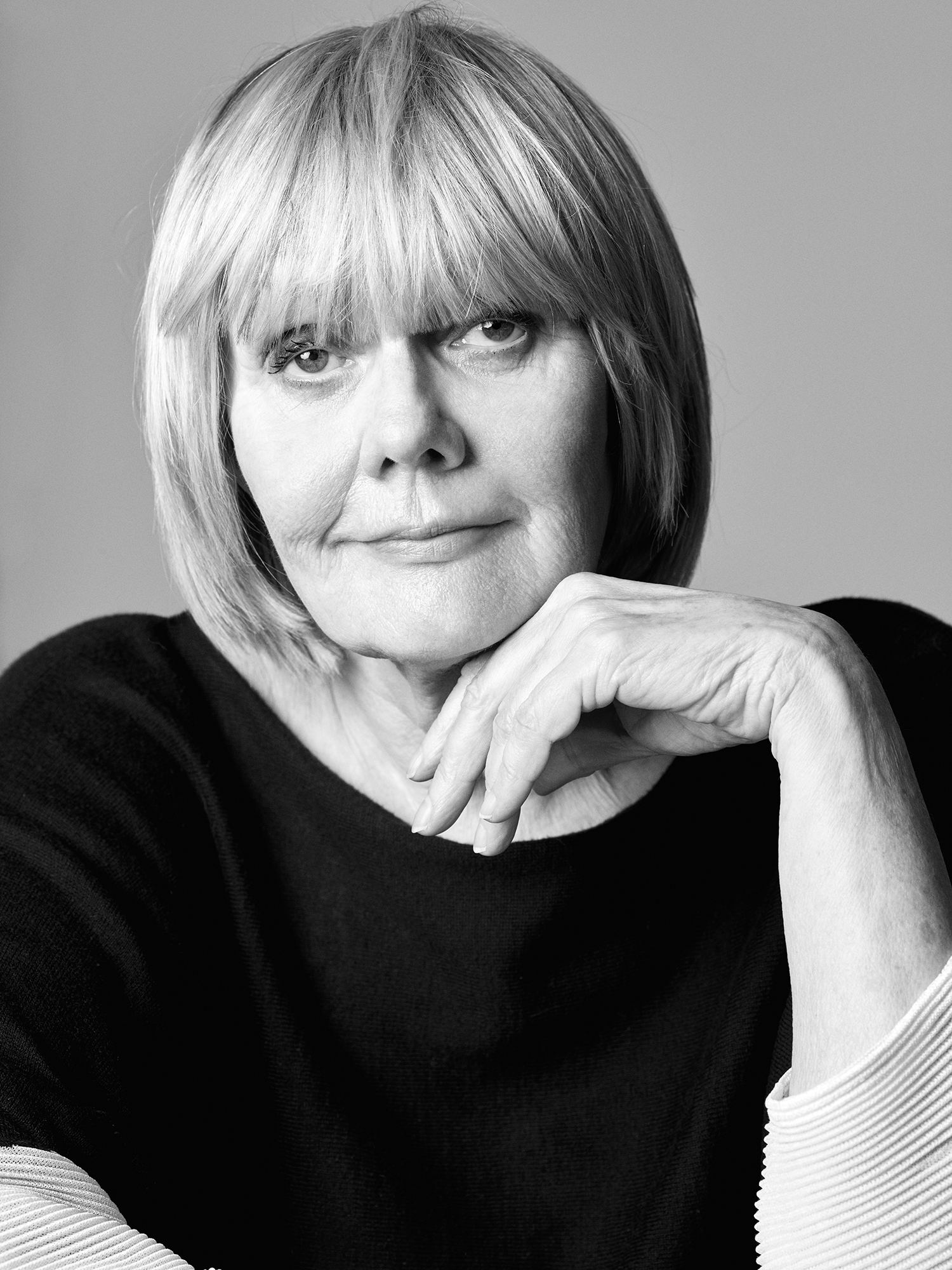
- Renny Ramakers by Wendelien Daan, 2018
- Education: Leiden University
- Known for: Co-founder of Droog Dutch design company
- Website: http://www.rennyramakers.com/

Renny Ramakers is a Dutch art historian, curator, design critic, and co-founder and director of the Droog design foundation. Ramakers writes articles, gives lectures, initiates projects and curates exhibitions in the field of art and design. In 2007 she was awarded the Benno Premsela Prize, in 2019 the IJprijs for her cultural contribution to the city of Amsterdam, and in 2018 she received a Dutch Royal Award for her work in the field of Dutch Design.

== Life and work ==
Ramakers graduated in art history at the University of Leiden in 1982. Her graduation work published in 1984 was about the Nederlandsche Bond voor Kunst in Industrie, a Dutch union for arts and crafts and industrial design.

Later in the 1980s Ramakers wrote articles about design in the national newspapers NRC Handelsblad and de Volkskrant. In 1987 she joined forces with Christine de Baan and Ed Annink and founded the Foundation Products of Imagination, which initiated and organized multiple design projects and publications.

In the 1990s Ramakers was editor-in-chief of the design magazine Industrieel ontwerpen.. After the merger of this magazine with the magazine Items, Tijdschrift voor vormgeving in 1993 she was editor-in-chief of the new magazine for a few years .

In 1992, still editor in chief of Industrieel ontwerpen, Ramakers had become impressed by the new generation of Dutch designers. At Galery Marzee in Nijmegen she had discovered the work of Jurgen Bey and Jan Konings, and later on also the graduation work of Tejo Remy and Piet Hein Eek. The following year she presented this with similar work at the stand of her magazine at the Courtray Design Biennale Interieur in Kortrijk. Early 1992, Ramakers organised an exhibition with these designers and others in Paradiso, titled Een middag gewoon doen ("acting regular for an afternoon"). This is when the collaboration with Gijs Bakker started. Bakker coined the umbrella term Droog (dry), and driven by the success of that exhibition, they went to the Salone del Mobile in Milan to present it there. With Bakker, Ramakers subsequently founded the Droog Design Foundation for the promotion and distribution of renewing design.

Bakker and Ramakers expanded Droog in the Netherlands and abroad in the next decade, with a new presentation at the Salone del Mobile in Milan each year. Gijs Bakker went his own way again in 2009, Ramakers remained director of Droog.

In 2012, Hôtel Droog opened in the Staalstraat in the center of Amsterdam, a premise with hotel room, gallery, office spaces, shop and restaurant. Ramakers initiated many innovative projects with Droog, such as Design for Download and Up and in 2014, together with Mark van der Net, Design+Desires, witch proposes communal initiatives for the ideal city of the future. In 2018 Aaron Betsky wrote a biography about Ramakers, published by Lars Muller Publishers and designed by Irma Boom.

As curator, expansive projects were Open Borders in Lille in 2006 en Pioneers of Change at Governor's Island in New York in 2009, celebrating 400 years of collaboration between New York and the Netherlands.

In 2019, following an interior design project with Droog, Ramakers was invited as guest curator for the eighth Biennial of São Tomé e Príncipe. She curated N'GOLÁ, a festival event with concerts, workshops, performances and exhibitions featuring artists from Sub-Saharan Africa, including Sunny Dolat, Christian Benimana, Joana Choumali and Mary Sibande.

The following year, Ramakers curated the pop-up exhibition Now Look Here - The African Art of Appearance in Amsterdam Noord, and the group exhibition Onward&Upward in the gallery spaces of Droog, which responds to the uncertainty at the time of the COVID-19 crisis.

== Projects, a selection ==
- Gemengd Nieuws, Centraal Museum Utrecht, in collaboration with Ida van Zijl, 1987
- Chair Sweet Chairs, Paris, Utrecht, Milan, Moscow, 1990
- “Design Now! Design from the Netherlands”, Centre de design de l’UQAM, Montreal, Canada, 1996
- Familiar, at the Tendency Fair, Frankfurter Messe, Germany, in collaboration with Ed Annink, 1998
- System Almighty, The San Francisco Museum, 2001
- Open Borders, Design etc., Lille, France, 2006
- Simply Droog, 10+1 Years of Creating Innovation and Discussion, München, The Hague, Bremen, Lausanne, Zürich, Curitiba, Grand Hornu, New York; editor of accompanying catalogue in English, 2004-2006
- Smart Deco project in collaboration with Friedman Benda gallery, New York, 2006
- The traveling exhibition ‘A Human Touch’; editor of accompanying catalogue in English, 2006-2008
- Festival ‘Pioneers of Change’, Governors Island, New York, 2009
- SZHKSMZ Special Material Zone, Bi-City Biennale of Urbanism/Architecture (UABB), Shenzhen, China, 2013
- Design+Desires, The Netherlands, 2014
- Enter the Past and See the Future, Droog Gallery, Amsterdam, 2018
- N’GOLÁ Biennial of Arts and Culture, São Tomé e Príncipe, 2019
- Now Look Here, Amsterdam, 2020
- Onward&Upward, Amsterdam, 2020

== Publications, a selection ==
- Renny Ramakers, Tussen kunstnijverheid en industriële vormgeving: de Nederlandsche Bond voor Kunst in Industrie, 1985.
- Gijs Bakker, Renny Ramakers. Gijs Bakker [München, 1993], 1994.
- Renny Ramakers, Gijs Bakker, Droog Design. Droog Design: Spirit of the Nineties. 1998.
- Renny Ramakers, Less + More: Droog Design in Context, 2002.
- Renny Ramakers, Agata Jaworska, Here, There, Everywhere, 2014
- Aaron Betsky, Renny Ramakers: Rethinking Design, 2018.

== Awards ==
- Prix d’Excellence de la Maison, Marie Claire magazine, 1997
- Kölner Klopfer Prize, 1998
- Dedalus Prize for European Design, 1998
- Kho Liang Ie Prize by Amsterdams Fonds voor de Kunst, 2000
- Benno Premsela Prize together with Gijs Bakker, 2007
- One of the “150 Women Who Shake the World” by Newsweek, 2012
- Peoples’ Choice Award for SZHKSMZ Special Material Zone, UABB, Shenzhen, 2013
- Amsterdam Business Award, 2014
- Best Tech Milano Design Award, 2015
- Best Details, Wallpaper*, 2015
- Designer do Ano (Designer of the Year), MADE, São Paulo, 2016
- Peoples’ Choice Award for Social City, UABB, Shenzhen, 2016
- Dutch Royal Honours “Lintje”, 2018
- IJ-prijs of Amsterdam, together with Leon Ramakers, 2019
