= Joris Laarman =

Dutch designer, artist and entrepreneur (born 1979)

Joris Hendricus Laarman
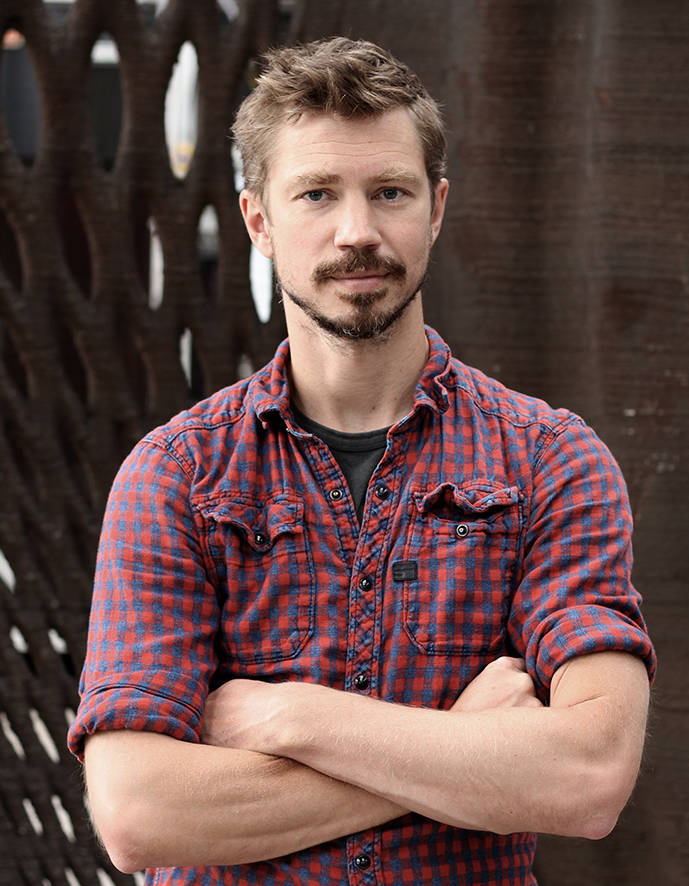
- Joris Laarman in 2017
- Born: October 24, 1979 (age 46); Borculo, Netherlands
- Occupation: Dutch artist
- Website: jorislaarman.com

Joris Hendricus Laarman (born October 24, 1979) is a Dutch designer, artist, furniture maker, and entrepreneur best known for his experimental designs inspired by emerging technologies.

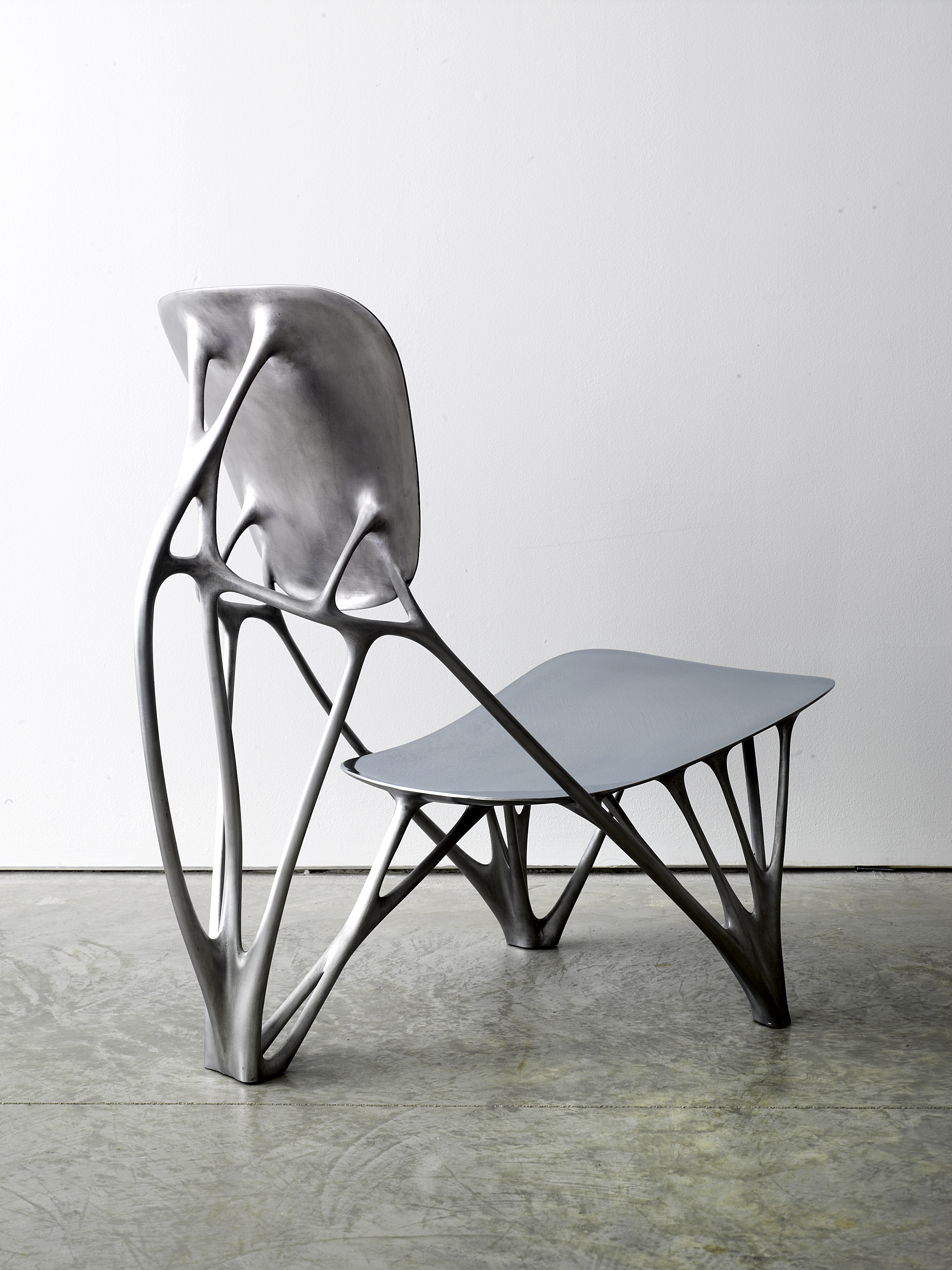
Bone chair (2006)

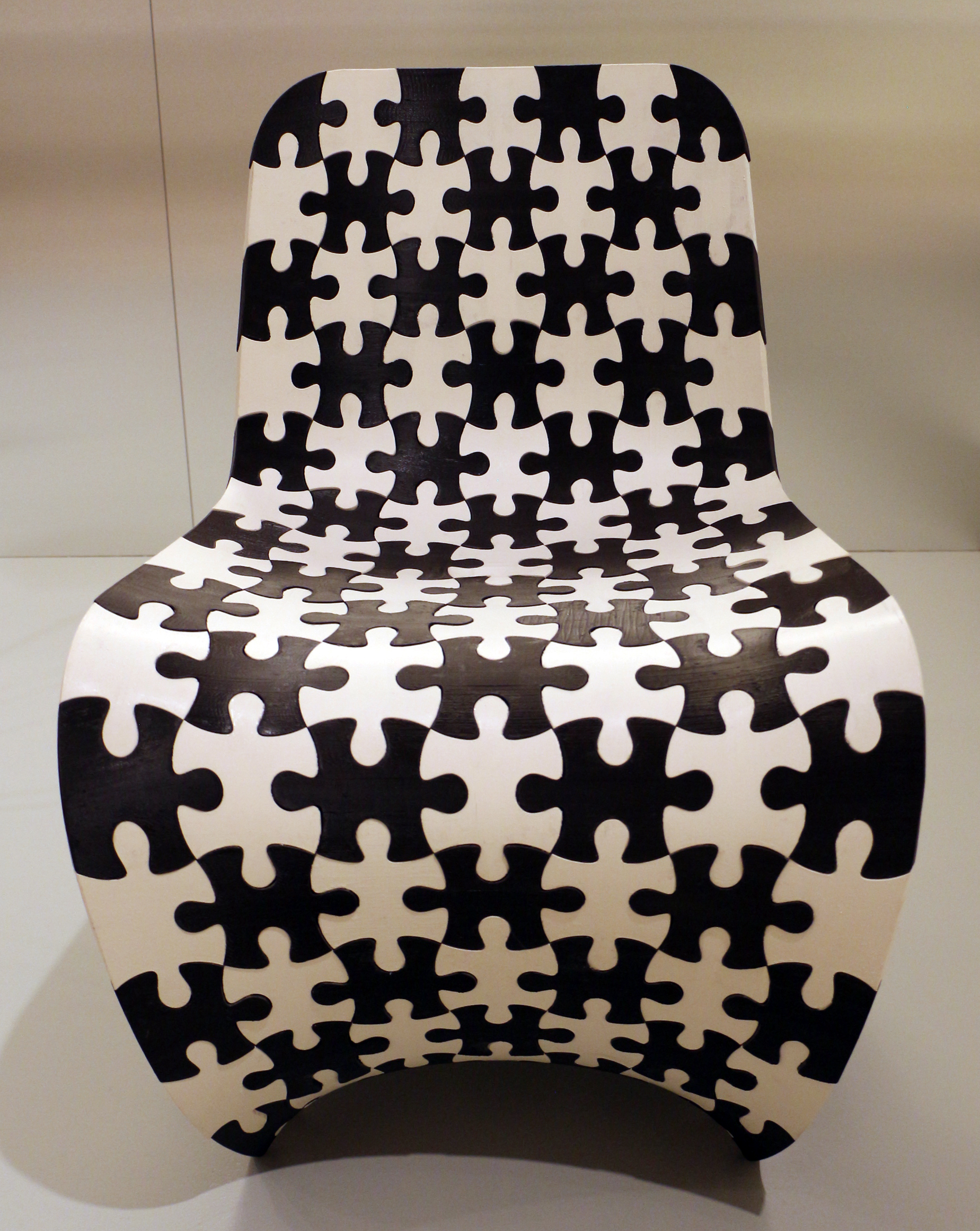
Puzzle Makerchair (2014)

== Biography ==
Laarman was born in Borculo, Netherlands. He graduated cum laude from the Design Academy Eindhoven in 2003. Laarman first received international recognition for his "Heatwave radiator" produced by the Dutch design brand Droog and later manufactured by Jaga Climate Systems. Heatwave radiator is now on public display at the High Museum of Art in Atlanta, Georgia, USA.

In 2004, Laarman together with his partner Anita Star, founded Joris Laarman Lab in Amsterdam, Netherlands. The lab collaborates with craftsmen, scientists and engineers and the possibilities of emerging technologies as CNC systems, 3D printing, robotics or simulation software.

Laarman's designs are in the permanent collections and exhibitions in such institutions as MoMA, New York City; V&A, London; Centre Pompidou, Paris. The Bonechair and its prototype were recently added as the closing works of the 20th century collection of the Rijksmuseum, Amsterdam.

He has contributed to articles and seminars for Domus Magazine and has lectured at the Architectural Association School of Architecture, London, the Gerrit Rietveld Academy, Amsterdam and the Design Academy Eindhoven.

In 2013, the Lab collaborated with Greenpeace installing a time capsule at the bottom of the arctic sea for the Save the Arctic campaign.

== Selected works ==
- MX3D Bridge, 2021
- Digital Matter, 2011
- Half Life, 2010
- Cumulus, 2010
- Nebula, 2007
- Bone Furniture, 2006
- Heatwave Radiator, 2003

== Awards ==
- 2018: Starts prize awarded by the European Commission for MX3D & Joris Laarman Lab (NL) and Giulia Tomasello (IT)
- 2011: Wall Street Journal, Innovator of the year Award
- 2008: International Elle Decoration, Designer of the year
- 2006: Red Dot Design Award
- 2004: Wallpaper magazine, Young designer of the year
- 2004: The International Furniture Fair, IMM, Interior Innovation Award
- 2004: Red Dot Design Award

== Exhibitions ==
- 2010 Art Institute of Chicago, Chicago, USA
- 2011 Now, Perceptions of Time and Contemporary Design. Museum MARTa Herford, Herford, Germany
- 2011 Modern by Design. High Museum of Art, Atlanta, GA
- 2011 Creative Junctions, National museum of China, Beijing, China
- 2011 Material World, Groninger Museum, Groningen, The Netherlands
- 2011 100 Masterpieces of Design, Centre Pompidou, Paris, France
- 2011 Hyperlinks, Chicago Art Institute, Chicago, IL
- 2011 Post Fossil, Design Museum Holon, Holon, Israel
- 2017 Gwanju Design Biennale, Gwanju City, Korea
- 2017 Minding the Digital, Design Society, Shenzhen, China
- 2017 Joris Laarman Lab, Cooper Hewitt, Smithsonian Design Museum, New York, USA
- 2017 Hello, Robot. Design between Human and Machine, Vitra Design Museum, Weil am Rhein, DE
- 2018 Joris Laarman Lab, High Museum of Art, Atlanta, USA
- 2018 Joris Laarman Lab, Museum of Fine Arts (MFA), Houston, USA
- 2018 Solo Exhibition, Kukje Gallery, Seoul, Korea
- 2019 La Fabrique du Vivant, Centre Pompidou, Paris, France
- 2023 Mirror Mirror: Reflections on Design at Chatsworth at Chatsworth House, UK

== Collections ==
Art Institute of Chicago, Chicago, USA

Centraal Museum, Utrecht, NL

Centre Pompidou, Paris, FR

Cooper-Hewitt National Design Museum, New York, NY

Droog Design, Amsterdam, Netherlands

Denver Art Museum, Denver, USA

DSM art foundation, NL

Indianapolis Museum of Art, Indianapolis, USA

Israel Museum, Jerusalem, ISR

LACMA, Los Angeles, USA

Metropolitan Museum of Art, New York, USA

Milwaukee Art Museum, Milwaukee, USA

MoMA, New York, USA

Montreal Museum of Fine Arts, Montreal, CAN

San Francisco Museum of Modern Art

Victoria & Albert Museum, London, UK
