= Gijs Bakker =

Dutch jewelry designer (born 1942)

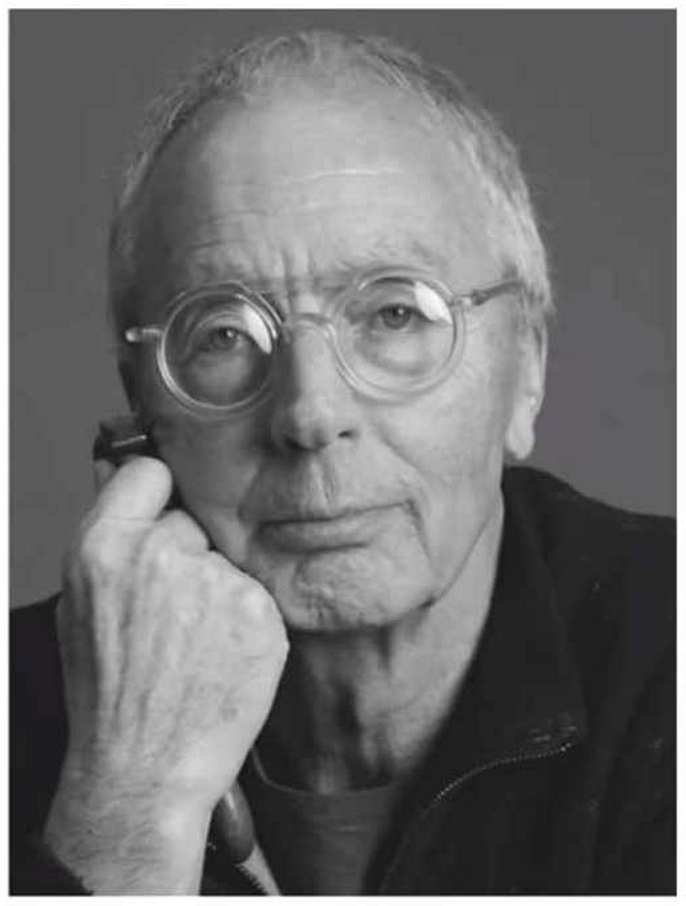
- Born: 20 February 1942 (age 84); Amersfoort
- Education: Gerrit Rietveld Academie, Konstfack, European Ceramics Work Center
- Occupations: Jewelry designer, designer, sculptor, gallerist (1965–1969), university teacher, entrepreneur, photographer, ceramics designer, textile designer, industrial designer, environmental artist, fashion designer, goldsmith, furniture designer
- Spouse: Emmy van Leersum
- Children: Aldo Bakker
- Relatives: Tiny Leeuwenkamp-Bakker
- Awards: Françoise van den Bosch Prijs (1988); Knight of the Order of the Netherlands Lion (2018)
- Website: www.gijsbakker.com

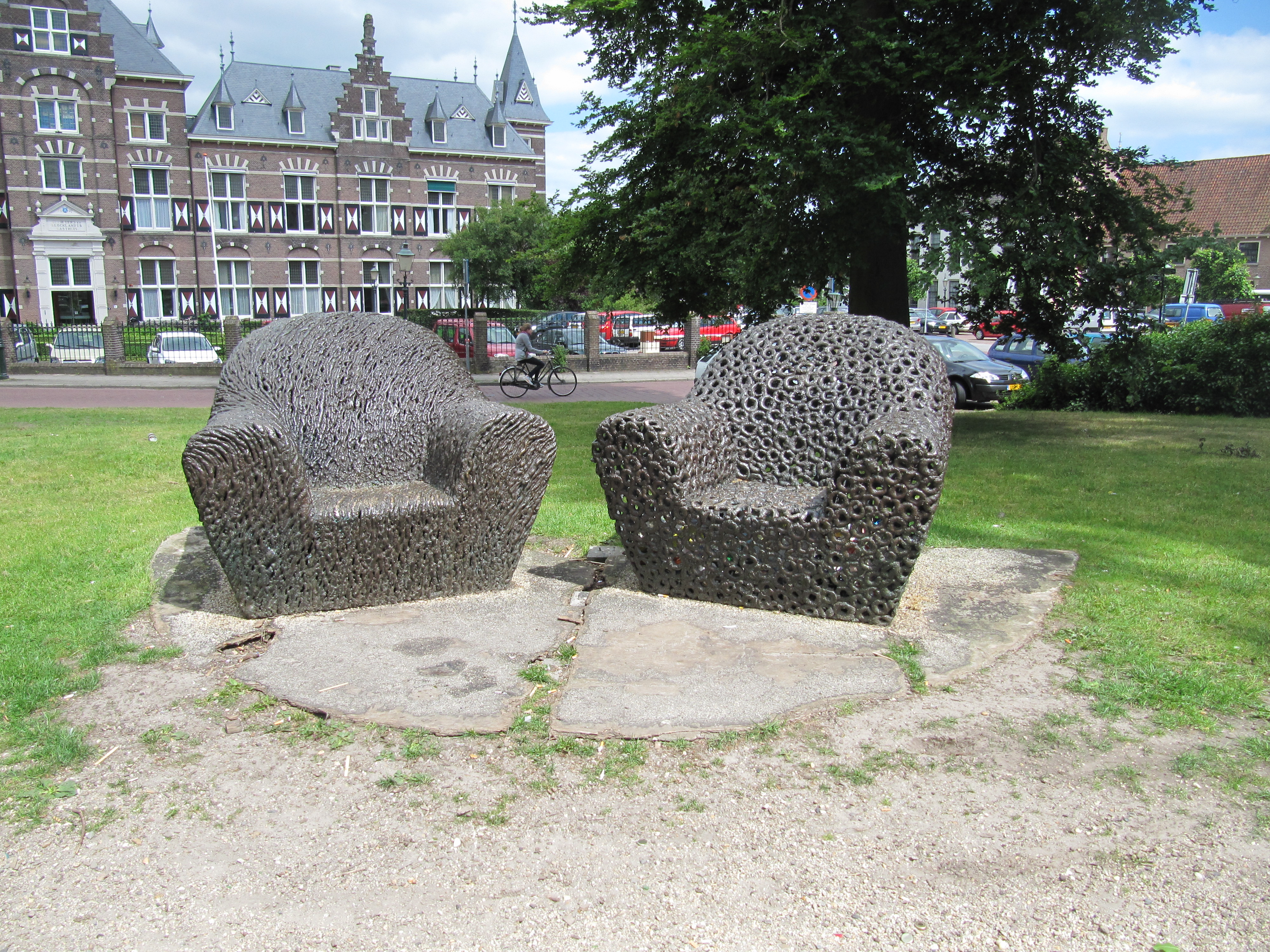
Arty benches (2000) by Gijs Bakker

Gijs Bakker (born 20 February 1942 in Amersfoort) is a Dutch jewellery and industrial-designer, educated at the Gerrit Rietveld Academie in Amsterdam, the Netherlands and the Konstfackskolan in Stockholm, Sweden.

Bakker's designs cover jewellery, home accessories and household appliances, furniture, interiors, public spaces and exhibitions. He worked and works for numerous companies amongst which are Polaroid, Artifort, HEMA, Royal VKB, and ENO Studio. Bakker is widower of the jewellery designer Emmy van Leersum.

In 1993 he founded Droog Design together with design critic and historian Renny Ramakers, a Dutch collective of designers, products and information. Together with Ramakers, he was the selector and art director of all products within Droog Design until 2009. In 2007 he and Renny Ramakers had been awarded the Benno Premsela Prize for their joint effort.

Bakker has also taught for more than 40 years at different schools, among others the Delft University of Technology and the Design Academy Eindhoven, where he worked since 1987 until 2012 (since 2000 as Head of the Masters Programme).

Together with Italian gallery owner Marijke Vallanzasca, Bakker founded the Chi ha paura...? (Italian for 'who is afraid of') foundation in 1996. With Chi ha paura...? (CHP...?) They wanted to show the international design world that a piece of jewellery is more than a decorative fashion accessory. With this CHP...? challenged the widespread fear for contemporary jewellery.

From 2009 onwards, Bakker has investigated the relation between craft and design in the Netherlands. Abroad, he is active regarding this issue by becoming creative director for Yii Taiwan in 2009. Commissioned by the Taiwanese Craft and Design council, Yii was founded to create a stronger and more sustainable coherence between local Taiwanese craft traditions and contemporary design practice in Taiwan. The brand was also established to develop a more prolific design identity for Taiwan.

Gijs Bakker travels around the world to give workshops, lectures and is frequently a member in juries. His retrospective exhibition "Gijs Bakker and Jewelry" (and accompanying monography) was on display in various museums around the world. His work is represented in collections, both in museums and privately, worldwide.

== Public Collections ==
- Centraal Museum, Utrecht
- Collectie Françoise van den Bosch
- Museum Boijmans Van Beuningen, Rotterdam
- Museum voor Moderne Kunst, Arnhem
- Rijksmuseum Amsterdam
- Schmuckmuseum Pforzheim
- Stedelijk Museum Amsterdam
- Stedelijk Museum 's-Hertogenbosch
- Victoria and Albert Museum, London
