= Phaidon Design Classics =

Reference books on industrial design

- Phaidon Design Classics is a three volume set
- Language: English
- Subject: Industrial design
- Publisher: Phaidon Press Limited
- Publication date: April 2006
- Publication place: United Kingdom
- Media type: Hardcover book
- Pages: 3,300
- ISBN: 0714843997
- OCLC: 69173887
- Dewey Decimal: 745.209 and 745.203
- LC Class: NK1320 .P438 2006

Phaidon Design Classics is a British three volume set of reference books on industrial design since the 17th century.

It lists 999 objects that the editorial team chose as design classics.

Alan Fletcher was the art director for the project, and the books were designed by Adam Hooper of Hoop Design.

List of contributors
Simon Alderson	Charles Gates	Charles Mellersh
Ralph Ball	Laura Giacalone	Alex Milton
Edward Barber	Grant Gibson	Christopher Mount
Lis Bogdan	Anna Goodall	Tim Parsons
Annabelle Campbell	Katy Djunn	Jane Pavitt
Claire Catterall	Ultan Guilfoyle	James Peto
Daniel Charny	Roo Gunzl	Phaidon Editors
Roberto Feo	Bruce Hannah	Michael Pritchard
Andrea Codrington	Sam Hecht	Mark Rappolt
Louise-Anne Comeau	Albert Hill	Hani Rashid
Geoffrey Monge	Ben Huges	Louise Schouwenberg
Alberto Cossu	Iva Janakova	Daljit Singh
Ilse Crawford	Meaghan Kombol	Rosanne Somerson
Kevin Davies	Kieran Long	Penny Sparke
Jan Dekker	Donna Loveday	Thimo te Duits
John Dunnigan	Hansjerg Maier-Aichen	Anthony Whitfield
Caroline Ednie	Sara Manuelli	William Wiles
Aline Ferrari	Michael Marriott	Gareth Williams
Max Fraser	Catherine McDermott	Megumi Yamashita
Richard Garnier	Justin McGuirk	Yolanda Zappaterra
