= Piet Hein Eek =

Dutch designer

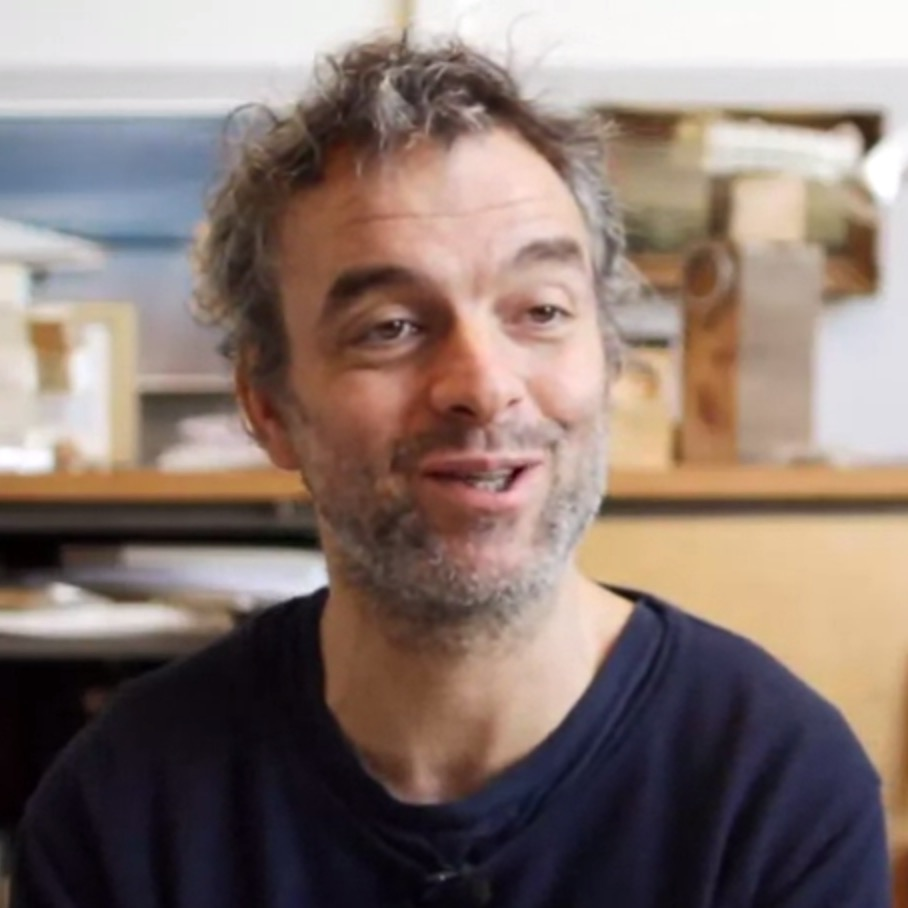
- Born: April 29, 1967 (age 59); Purmerend
- Education: Design Academy Eindhoven
- Known for: Design
- Awards: Culture Prize Brabant
- Website: pietheineek.nl/en

Piet Hein Eek is a Dutch designer. He is known for designs which require significant time from craftspeople, despite using very inexpensive, found materials.

== Work ==
Piet Hein Eek's work has an ecological focus. His emphasis on using found materials is in service of a sustainable design practice. His designs often bring out natural qualities of his materials, giving his pieces a distinctive look.

He has undertaken projects in sustainability in developing countries, as well as furniture design and production projects in his native the Netherlands. In 2018, he developed a furniture line in collaboration with IKEA.
