= John Bezold =

American-Dutch journalist, editor and art historian (born 1985)

- Born: November 6, 1985 (age 40)
- Education: University of Cincinnati; University of Amsterdam
- Occupations: Author, editor, journalist, historian, podcaster

John Bezold (born 6 November 1985) is an American-Dutch journalist, editor, author, historian, and podcaster based in Amsterdam. He has published on design, art, and architecture in print and digital media, began his career at Frame magazine, and has contributed scholarly research on the Dutch Golden Age.

== Education ==
Bezold graduated from the University of Cincinnati College of Design, Architecture, Art, and Planning with a BSc in architecture (2008), and received an MA (2015) and Research MA (2017) from the University of Amsterdam.

== Journalism and publishing ==
Bezold started in journalism at Frame in Amsterdam, contributing articles on architecture and design. In 2008, he published an early interview with designer and researcher Neri Oxman examining her experimental approach to materials, then described as "materiology".

He was a contributing editor for Mark magazine, covering contemporary architecture, from 2009 to 2017.

Between 2009 and 2021, Bezold collaborated with architect Wiel Arets on publications addressing architectural practice, photography, education and urban theory. An early project, Wiel Arets: Autobiographical References (2012), combined Arets's projects with his lectures, debates and interviews tracing the relationship between his biography, teaching and design philosophy. Bezold served as assistant editor of the volume, which was designed by Irma Boom and selected as one of the 2012 Best Dutch Book Designs.

Bezold subsequently edited Wiel Arets–Bas Princen (2015), a photographic study of twelve Arets buildings during construction and use, photographed by Bas Princen and designed by Mevis & Van Deursen.

His work also encompassed publications connected with Arets's tenure as dean of the Illinois Institute of Technology College of Architecture. Crown Hall Dean's Dialogues 2012–2017 assembled conversations between students and 18 architects, designers, educators and cultural figures, including Kazuyo Sejima, Peter Eisenman, Phyllis Lambert, David Adjaye and Erwin Olaf. Nowness Files: 2012–2018 IIT Architecture Chicago, for which Bezold served as assistant editor, documented the development of the college's curriculum, publications, lectures and institutional initiatives during Arets's deanship.

In 2019, Bezold edited Un-Conscious-City, which presented Arets's theories of urban life, centred on Tokyo. Designed by Mainstudio, the book was included among the titles honoured by the Deutsches Architekturmuseum's 2019 DAM Architectural Book Award and selected as one of the 2019 Best Dutch Book Designs.

In the jury report for the latter selection, Rein Wolfs, director of the Stedelijk Museum Amsterdam, described Un-Conscious-City as "strong and sensitive", "rough yet controlled", and "completely convincing".

=== Podcast ===
Since 2022, Bezold has hosted Dutch Art & Design Today, an interview podcast examining art and design connected with the Netherlands. The series features conversations with museum curators, art educators, artists, designers and publishers about their work and its cultural context. The podcast has featured guests including neuroscientist Jill Bolte Taylor.

== Scholarship ==
In 2016, Bezold was a research fellow at the Mauritshuis in The Hague, receiving a grant to analyze the museum's painting acquisitions.

He has published and lectured on Frans Hals, focusing on the history of the artist's exhibitions, reputation and connoisseurship.

In the late-2010s, he authored a column on museum curation trends in the journal Museumvisie, published by the Dutch Museum Association.

=== Oud Holland ===
From 2019 to 2024, Bezold served as review editor and a member of the editorial board of Oud Holland, a scholarly journal devoted to art of the Low Countries. During his tenure, he helped establish and develop the journal's online presence.

== Selected publications ==
Bezold's selected publications include:

- "Frans Hals (London, National Gallery, 20 September 2023–21 January 2024 and Amsterdam, Rijksmuseum, 16 February–9 June 2024)." Renaissance Studies, April 2025. https://doi.org/10.1111/rest.12983
- Harmonic Consonance: Being Beyond Time. Semicolon-Press, 2025, ISBN 978-9090399508.
- "Frans Hals Connoisseurs and Exhibitions: From Thoré to Today." In Frans Hals: Iconography – Technique – Reputation, edited by Norbert E. Middelkoop and Rudi Ekkart, 221–243. Amsterdam University Press, 2024. https://doi.org/10.2307/jj.22135982.18.
- "Frans Hals: The Male Portrait." Early Modern Low Countries, 6(2) (2022), pp. 278–280, ISSN 2543-1587.
- Un-conscious-City. Actar, 2019, ISBN 978-1945150654
- Basquiat: The Artist and His New York Scene. Schunck, Heerlen 2019, ISBN 978-9462087071.
- "Vreemde Wereld: Door tentoonstellingen te populariseren, vergroten musea hun doelgroep. Rijk of arm, homo of hetero, bekend of onbekend: portretten bereiken nieuw publiek." Museumvisie 2 (2018), pp. 62–63, ISSN 0166-2074.
- "Amos Rex Museum in Helsinki." Museumvisie 4 (2018), pp. 62–63, ISSN 0166-2074.
- Ellen Kooi: Above Rotterdam. Actar, New York 2016, ISBN 978-1945150227.
- "The IJhal in Amsterdam's Central Train Station." Domus, no. 1007 (Nov. 2016), pp. 60–71, ISSN 0012-5377.
- Wiel Arets—Bas Princen. Hatje Cantz, Ostfildern 2015, ISBN 978-3775735056.
- "Paper Gallery: Ellen Kooi." Elephant Magazine, no. 20 (2014), ISSN 1879-3835.
- "Herzog & De Meuron in Tenerife." Frame, no. 67 (Mar./Apr. 2009), p. 67, ISSN 1388-4239.
- "Migrating Formations by CAP." Frame, no. 66 (Jan./Feb. 2009), p. 75, ISSN 1388-4239.
- "Abandoned Amusements." Mark Magazine, no. 17 (2008), pp. 156–163, ISSN 1574-6453.
- "No Joints Needed: Neri Oxman Reshapes Architecture." Mark Magazine, no. 16 (2008), ISSN 1574-6453.
