= Mathery =

Italian film director and photography duo

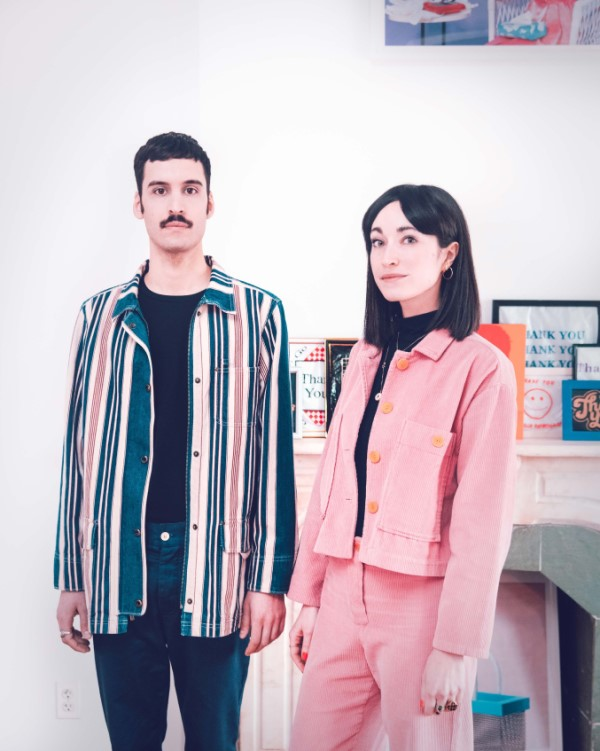
- Mathery is Matteo Sangalli and Erika Zorzi
- Website: mathery.it

Erika Zorzi and Matteo Sangalli are Mathery, an artist duo working in film direction, photography and the design of exhibition spaces.

Zorzi and Sangalli were both born in Italy and attended NABA (New Academy of Arts) in Milan. They currently live in Brooklyn, NY and are represented internationally by 1stAveMachine.

== Key Projects ==
Mathery has found success in projects intended both for cultural showcase and in commercial formats. They have directed television commercials for brands such as Google, Nestlé, Target, Jaguar, Deloitte, Ikea, Dolce & Gabbana, and KFC.

Mathery's interactive exhibition Pastello - Draw Act was commissioned and exhibited by the National Gallery of Victoria in Australia. It subsequently toured internationally. The NGV also exhibited and acquired for its collection "Fruit Wares," Mathery's series of fruit-themed homewares.

Mathery wrote and directed the opening film for the OFFF festival 2018 in Barcelona, in addition to design the overarching branding and marketing campaign for the festival. Another Mathery film project, Fiber Affair, premiered on Nowness and was shortlisted by the Berlin Film Festival.

Mathery's work has included product design, such as the Josie Chair and the fashion-inspired collection they created in collaboration with 69, Kloke and FFIXXED Studios.

== Awards and Press ==
Mathery's Pastello - Draw Act was named a winner in the 2014 IDEA Awards. It was also named by Wired as one of the 27 most inspiring designs of 2014 and by Domus as one of the top 15 design projects for kids of 2014.

Mathery has been awarded the Young Guns Award 16 and their work has been featured in additional magazines including Vogue, i-D, Frame, Casa Vogue Brazil, Design Quarterly, Gourmet Traveller, Home and Dècor Malaysia, Monocle, Vanity Fair, and Vogue Italia.

== Books ==
Mathery's work is featured in the book Visual Feast, Contemporary Food Staging and Photography from Gestalten Verlag and is the subject of the 37th issue of Un Sedicesimo (Un sedicesimo 37: The Sample Book by Mathery Studio), a magazine published bimonthly by Corraini Edizioni that focuses each issue on a leading creative professional (the subjects of other issues include Antonio Marras, Giulio Iacchetti, and Martí Guixé). Mathery's exhibition design Tubo is featured in the book Happening 2: Design for Events, published by Frame magazine.

== Exhibitions ==
Mathery's work was exhibited as part of the Italian Design Under 35 exhibition at the Triennale Milano in New Delhi, as well as in the 2016 Hangzhou International Design Week in China and the 2015 Milan Design Week at the Triennale Museum in Italy. Their work has been exhibited by additional major cultural institutions including Foundation Mons (Brussels), Modefabriek (Amsterdam), TAC (Eindhoven) and the Science and Technology Museum of Milan. Several of those institutions also hosted lectures and workshops by Mathery, as have additional institutions including XUE XUE Institute (Taipei), NABA (Milan), The Public Society (New York), National Gallery of Victoria (Melbourne), RMIT (Melbourne), and Milan Trade School.
