= Edwin van Gelder =

Dutch graphic designer and art director (born 1978)

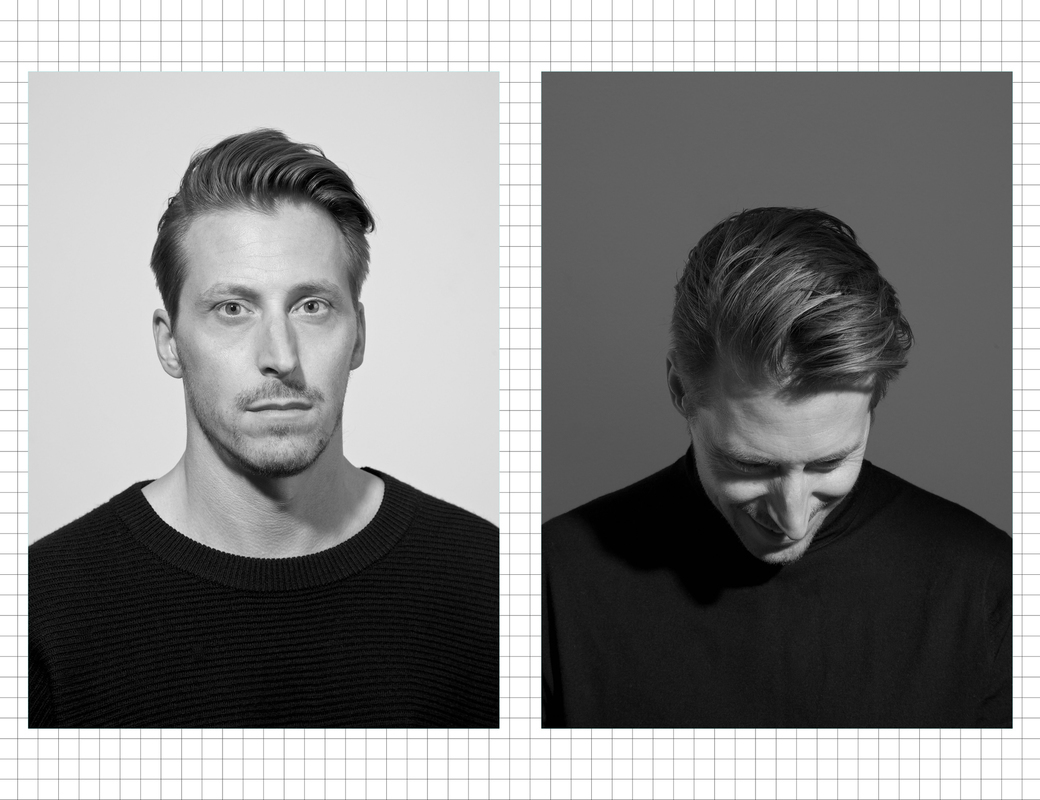
- Edwin Van Gelder
- Born: 21 January 1978 (age 48); Nijmegen, Netherlands
- Education: Utrecht School of the Arts
- Occupations: graphic designer art director
- Website: www.mainstudio.com

Edwin van Gelder (born 21 January 1978, Nijmegen) is a Dutch graphic designer and art director based in Amsterdam. He graduated from the graphic design department at the Utrecht School of the Arts in 2004. In 2005 Van Gelder founded graphic design studio Mainstudio.

Van Gelder is best known for his typographically driven, book and identity designs for clients within architecture, contemporary art, and fashion. He describes his work as Systemic Design — a term coined by Swiss designer Karl Gerstner. Through this approach, Van Gelder conveys the content and voice of a book or identity through the designs they are bound in.

Van Gelder is a guest lecturer at the Academy of Architecture Amsterdam (Academie van Bouwkunst).

== Awards ==
Van Gelder's work has been awarded with various design awards, including:

- 2021: Best Dutch Book Design for the artist books Masahisa Fukase – Kill the Pig and Jorge Méndez Blake – Lenguaje Desmantelado | Dismantled Language
- 2021: AIGA 50 Books 50 Covers for the artist book Masahisa Fukase – Kill the Pig
- 2020: shortlist DAM Architectural Book Award for the book design of The Walter Benjamin and Albert S. Project
- 2020: Type Directors Club for the visual identity of the festival Strange Sounds From Beyond
- 2020: AIGA 50 Books 50 Covers for the book Being The Mountain, Productora
- 2020: Best Dutch Book Design for the artist book Remy Jungerman. Where the River Runs and Wiel Arets - Unconscious City
- 2019: AIGA 50 Books 50 Covers for the artist book Remy Jungerman. Where the River Runs
- 2019: Best Dutch Book Design for the book design of The Walter Benjamin and Albert S. Project
- 2018: AIGA 50 Books 50 Covers for the artist book Álvaro Siza Viera: A Pool in the Sea
- 2017: Best Dutch Book Design for the monograph Tirzo Martha: I wonder if they’ll laugh when I’m dead
- 2017: ADCN (Club for Creativity) for the visual identity of De School
- 2016: Best Dutch Book Design for MCHAP 1 - The Americas
- 2012: Graphis Inc. 100 Best Annual Reports for the annual report of Mondriaan Foundation
- 2012: Communication Arts Typography Annual for STILLS, Wiel Arets, A Timeline of Ideas, Articles & Interviews 1982–2010
- 2012: Best Dutch Book Design for the artist book Thomas Raat - An Inquiry into Meaning and Truth and More…
- 2011: Best Dutch Annual Reports for the annual report of Mondriaan Foundation
- 2011: I.D. Magazine Annual Design Review
- 2011: Best Dutch Book Design for STILLS, Wiel Arets, A Timeline of Ideas, Articles & Interviews 1982–2010
- 2009: Art Directors Club New York for the magazine design of Mark Magazine (Frame Publishers)

== Projects ==
Notable projects that Van Gelder's design studio has worked on in recent years include:

- 2021: campaign Amsterdam Art Week
- 2017: visual identity Anne De Grijff
- 2016: rebranding of Illinois Institute of Technology School of Architecture, Chicago
- 2016: visual identity De School - former club and entertainment complex in Amsterdam
- 2009–2012: Mark Magazine (Frame Publishers), a platform for the practice and perception of architecture at the dawn of the third millennium. The magazine explores the boundaries of architecture and anticipates the industry's future. Mainstudio was responsible for the editorial design of the issues 17 (Dec/Jan 2009) to 36 (Feb/Mar 2012) and restyled the magazine twice.

== Design juries ==
Van Gelder has been part of the jury for the following design awards:

- 2021: Best Dutch Book Design
- 2012: The One Show Design New York
- 2011: Tokyo Graphic Passport
- 2011: Art Directors Club New York
- 2010: Selected Europe Barcelona
- 2010: Art Directors Club The Netherlands
