= Katrin Korfmann =

German artist

- Born: 1971 (age 54–55); Heidelberg, Baden-Württemberg, West Germany
- Occupation: Artist
- Known for: Photography
- Website: katrinkorfmann.com

Katrin Korfmann (1971) is a German artist, researcher, and educator who grew up in Berlin and is currently living and working in Amsterdam, The Netherlands.

== Life and work ==
Korfmann studied at the Rietveld Academie in Amsterdam, where she specialized in photography and continued her research with residencies at the Rijksakademie van beeldende kunsten in Amsterdam, Cittadellarte in Biella, Italy, and the Chinese European Art Centre in Xiamen, China. She also participated in the BijlmAIR artist-in-residence program in Amsterdam Zuidoost in 2021, in collaboration with Bradwolff Projects and the Stedelijk Museum. Since 2024, Katrin has been a PhD candidate at Leiden University and KABK, performing research in and through artistic practice.

Katrin has been a Senior tutor at the Royal Academy of Art, The Hague since 2010, where she currently teaches Image in the BA Graphic Design and Post Photography in the Master Linear Narrative. In addition to being a research fellow at KABK Research Group 2020-2025, Korfmann has lectured as a guest tutor at MFA Fine Arts Otis in Los Angeles, Master Performing Public Space Fontys Tilburg, Elisava Barcelona and the University of Art Kassel and Bremen, amongst others.

Owing to her background in photography, Katrin Korfmann’s work in various media – photo-works, videos and installations – is concerned with concepts of framing, perspective, and the social dimensions of perception, and pushes the boundaries of photography and representation.

An important determinant in her work are observations of specific public places, made visible through the presentation of different sequential incidents that have been registered within a given period and location, in one single spatial arrangement. The issue of responsibility for the existence of an image, the choice of the right moment and the framing that determines an image also play an important role in her work. Korfmann’s work maybe characterized by a formal level of composition, structure and spatiotemporal experience, that is aimed at the registration and investigation of social constructions and behavior in public space.

Since the late 1990s her work has been exhibited internationally in galleries, museums, alternative art institutions and public spaces. Her work is represented in numerous private and public international collections. She won several prizes for her work, including Radostar Prize (CH), Prix de Rome (2nd prize) and the Esther Kroon Award (NL), Bieler Fototage Prize (CH), Best Dutch Book Besigns (NL), and received various grants from international institutions such as Robert Bosch and Würth Foundation , Akademie der Künste Berlin (DE) and Mondriaan Fund, Hartenfonds (NL).

Korfmann published artist monographs and has received commissions from several organizations, including the Ministry of Finance, Rijksgebouwendienst, Schiphol Airport, Leiden University Medical Center, and Stockholm County Council.

She has exhibited internationally, including Photography Museum Rotterdam, Museum of Contemporary Art The Hague; Kemper Museum of Contemporary Art Kansas; Aperture New York; Three Shadows Art Centre Xiamen, and Frankfurter Kunstverein.

== Selected public and corporate collections ==
- Art Collection Ministry of Foreign Affairs, NL
- AMC Art Collection, NL
- Bouwfonds Art Collection Rabo Real Estate Group, NL
- ING Art Collection, NL
- Twitter, US
- Fotomuseum The Hague, NL
- Aegon Art Collectione, NL
- Würth Foundation, DE
- European Patent Office, NL
- Van Zoetendaal Art Collection, NL
- Robert Bosch Foundation, DE
- ARTIUM Centro-Museo Vasco de Arte Contemporáneo, E
- Ymere Art Collection, NL
- Balticgruppen, SE
- LeasePlan Corporation Art Collection, NL
- Stockholm County Council, SE
- Akzo Nobel Art Foundation, NL
- VandenBroek Foundation, NL
- Collection City of Umeå, SE
- Balticgruppen, SE

== Publications (monography) ==
- 2019 Back Stages, Best Dutch Book Designs (De Best Verzorgde Boeken), ISBN 978-94-93148-06-2, 124 pages, full color, 22.5 x 28.5 cm, published by Onomatopee
- 2014 Ensembles assembled, ISBN 9789491677199, 112 pages, full color, 17 x 23 cm, published by Onomatopee, NL
- 2010 KATRIN KORFMANN 200/2010, ISBN 978-90-89102-23-2,128 pages, full color, 32 x 24 cm, published by d ́jonge Hond, NL
- 2006 DL81 B-767-300ER, ISBN 3-88331-100-6, 40 pages, full color, 19 x 15 cm, published by Akademie der Künste, DE
- 2005 Blue Octagon, 160 pages, full color, 6 x 13 cm
- 2004 Katrin Korfmann, ISBN 90-73985-06-4, 32 pages, full color 19 x 15 cm, published by Carl Berg Gallery / Art Affairs, US / NL
