= Where They Create =

- First edition cover
- Author: Paul Barbera and Alexandra Onderwater
- Language: English
- Genre: Design
- Publisher: FRAME
- Publication date: November 15, 2011
- Publication place: United States
- Media type: Print (hardcover)
- Pages: 280
- ISBN: 9077174494

Where They Create is a book by photographer Paul Barbera and writer Alexandra Onderwater, published by FRAME in 2011. It documents over thirty creative studios from all around the world and covers a wide variety of professions, including painters, sculptors, designers, architects, and advertisers. New York City-based photographer Paul Barbera has a background shooting interiors for such magazines as Elle Decor and Vogue Living Paul created the book to give readers an insight into the inspiring spaces of creative professionals. All the studios are shot using only natural light and rarely contain human subjects. The book features alternate front covers for each different creative and is available all over the globe.
