= Sigrid Calon =

- Born: 26 April 1969 's-Hertogenbosch
- Education: European Ceramics Work Center, Fontys School of Fine and Performing Arts
- Occupations: Designer, textile artist, graphic artist, visual artist
- Website: www.sigridcalon.nl

Sigrid Calon (born 26 April 1969 in Den Bosch) is a Dutch visual artist whose work bridges graphic design, textile art, and geometric abstraction. She mainly creates abstract and very structured, diverse artworks in many media, and she explores (often bright) color, form, and pattern.

== Education ==
Born in 's-Hertogenbosch and raised in Eindhoven, Calon studied textile design at the Academy of Fine Arts in Tilburg. After a career in design and styling, she transitioned to autonomous art in 2005. She lives and works in Tilburg.

== Work ==
Calon often uses embroidery grids as a basis for her compositions. Her work includes risograph prints, textiles, ceramics, murals, and installations. In 2012, she published her first artist book, To the Extend of / \ | & –, featuring 120 risograph compositions based on a 3×3 dot grid. The book garnered international attention and was selected as one of the Best Dutch Book Designs ("De Best Verzorgde Boeken") of 2012.

== Exhibitions and collections ==
Calon's work has been exhibited internationally, including at art book fairs in Milan, Basel, Los Angeles, and New York. She had a solo presentation in Museum De Pont in Tilburg. Her works are part of various international collections, including the Victoria and Albert Museum, Rijksmuseum, Stedelijk Museum Amsterdam, and Museum Boijmans Van Beuningen.

== Collaborations and residencies ==
She has collaborated with companies such as Swatch, Uniqlo, and Forbo. In 2022, Calon completed a residency in Arita, Japan, where she explored ceramic techniques and created porcelain works inspired by everyday tools. In the Netherlands, she had a residence at the European Ceramic Work Centre and she produced objects for TextielMuseum Tilburg.
