= Monobloc (chair) =

Stackable polypropylene chair

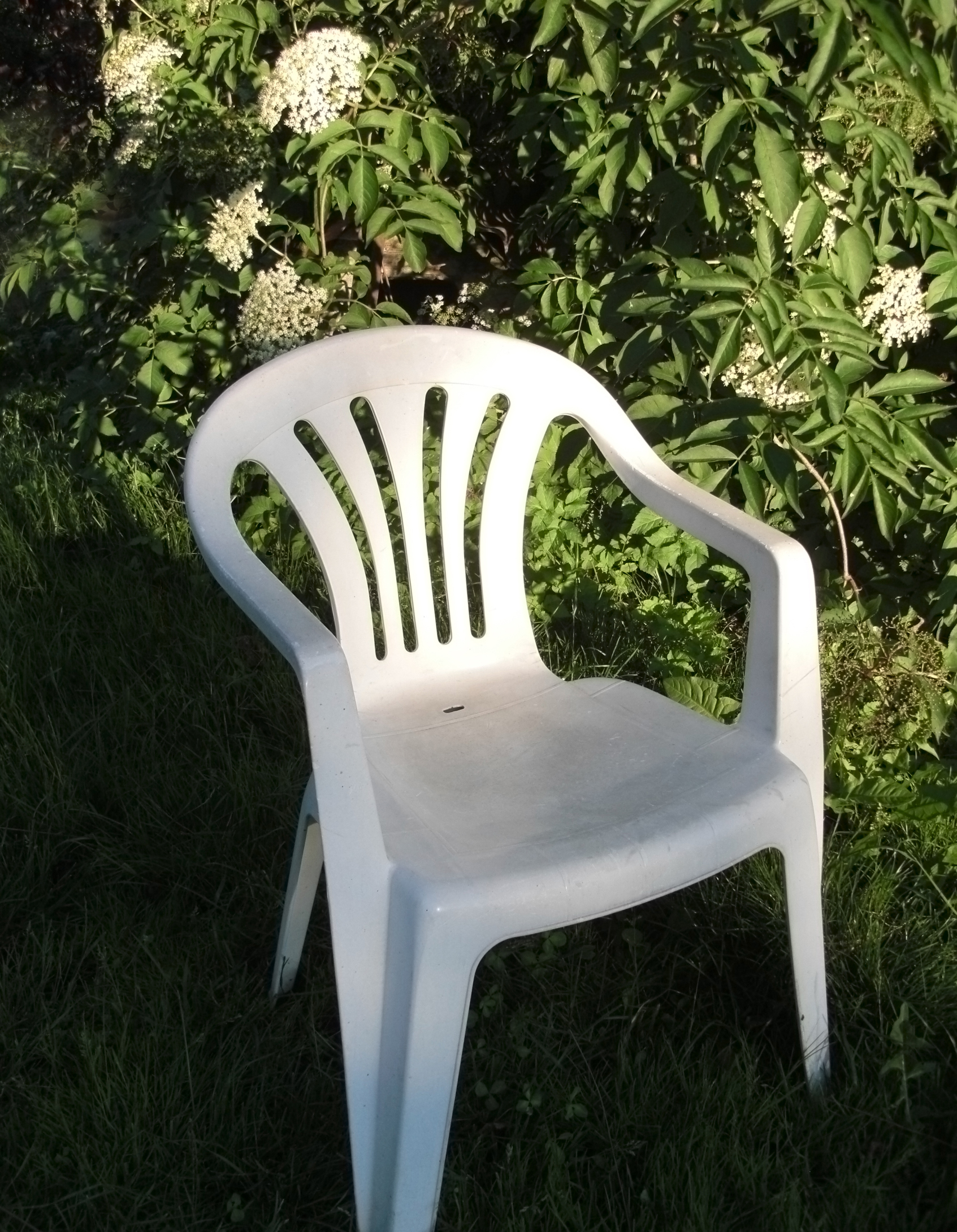
- A monobloc chair
- Materials: Polypropylene

The Monobloc chair is a lightweight stackable polypropylene chair, usually white in color, often described as the world's most common plastic chair. The name comes from mono- ("one") and bloc ("block"), in this case referring to an object injection moulded in a single piece.

== History ==
Variants of the one-piece plastic chair designed by Canadian Douglas C. Simpson in 1946 went into production with Allibert Group and Grosfillex Group in the 1970s. Other sources name the French engineer Henry Massonnet from Nurieux-Volognat with his "Fauteuil 300" from 1972 as the inventor of the Monobloc. Manufacture of these designs was preceded by Joe Colombo's Model 4867 Universal chair in 1965, and the 1967 Selene chair by Vico Magistretti (both made by Kartell), but no patents were filed for a monobloc chair design per se. Billions have been manufactured around the world since.

== Production and usage ==
The Monobloc chair is named this way because it is injection moulded from thermoplastic as one piece rather than being assembled from multiple pieces. Many variations and styles exist, but all are designed to allow the chair to be made quickly and cheaply through injection moulding. A standard material used is thermoplastic polypropylene, with the granules being heated approximately 220 °C (428 °F), and the resulting melt injected into a mould. The gate of the mould is usually located in the seat, ensuring smooth molten plastic flow to all parts of the tool.

Approximately one billion Monoblocs have been sold in Europe, with one Italian manufacturer producing over ten million units annually in 2004. The chairs cost approximately $3.50 to produce in 2011, making them both affordable and ubiquitous—in the billions—worldwide. Their lightweight and stackable design eases both their deployment and storage, even for large gatherings. One modern design weighs 2.7 kg (6.0 lb), half that of the standard make, and can be stacked 24 high. They are also prevalent in both corporate and individual outdoor usage due to features such as the slits on seat and backrest which rain water and wind pass through, their wide base which resists their occupants tipping over, and their sheer utility and replaceability.

The Monobloc has also proven to be of economic and practical importance in the developing world, due to its simplicity of manufacture enabling local production. They are affordable furniture (and sometimes the first modern furniture) for the lowest social strata, and have even been reconfigured as wheelchairs.

== Social reception ==
Social theorist Ethan Zuckerman described the chair as having achieved ubiquity at a global scale. Some have called it one of "the world's most perfectly designed object[s]". German novelist Ingo Niermann said that they were "the real evil of globalisation", since unlike Coca-Cola or McDonald's, monobloc chairs do not have a brand identity.

Monobloc plastic chairs were banned from public spaces in the city of Basel, Switzerland, from 2008 to 2017 in an attempt to preserve the beauty of the cityscape.

== Exhibitions ==
- 2017: Monobloc. A chair for the world at the Vitra Design Museum in Weil am Rhein.
- 2018: Honor Cheap Furniture by Martí Guixé at Galleria Nazionale d'Arte Moderna in Rome.
- Pirouette: Turning Points in Design – 2025 exhibition at the Museum of Modern Art
