= Floor Kuitert =

Dutch editor and design journalist

- Occupations: Editor, design journalist
- Years active: 2014–present
- Employer: FRAME
- Title: Editor-in-chief

Floor Kuitert is a Dutch editor and design journalist. Since 2024 she has been editor-in-chief of FRAME, the Amsterdam-based international magazine covering interior architecture.

== Career ==
Kuitert began writing for FRAME in 2014, reporting on Dutch Design Week, material research and experimental practice, and interviewing designers including Marcin Rusak. By 2015 she was an editor at the magazine, a position documented in subsequent mastheads.

Kuitert subsequently became managing editor, and in a 2019 interview with Fitsout, she described her editorial work as encompassing the sourcing and curation of projects, commissioning, writing and editing, photography production and collaboration with graphic designers. By 2022 she was head of content at FRAME. She remained in the position in 2023.

In January 2024, Kuitert succeeded FRAME co-founder Robert Thiemann as editor-in-chief. Fast Company announced Thiemann's departure after 26 years and the transfer of editorial leadership to Kuitert, while Dutch design publication DesignDigger independently reported that Kuitert would take over as editor-in-chief. Issue 156, published that spring, was the first to list her in the role.

Kuitert's journalism covers workplace, retail, hospitality and healthcare interiors, collective living, material innovation and sustainability.

== Publications ==
In 2016, Kuitert contributed text to Envisions: Products in Process, presented by the Dutch design collective Envisions during the Salone del Mobile in Milan. Among her books are:

- Grieco, Lauren; Kuitert, Floor (2017). Envisions: Products in Process. 2. Envisions. ISBN 9781366032904.
- What I've Learned: 28 Creatives Share Career-Defining Insights. Amsterdam: Frame Publishers. 2018. ISBN 9789492311269. (contributing writer)
