= Chiara Luzzana =

Italian artist and composer

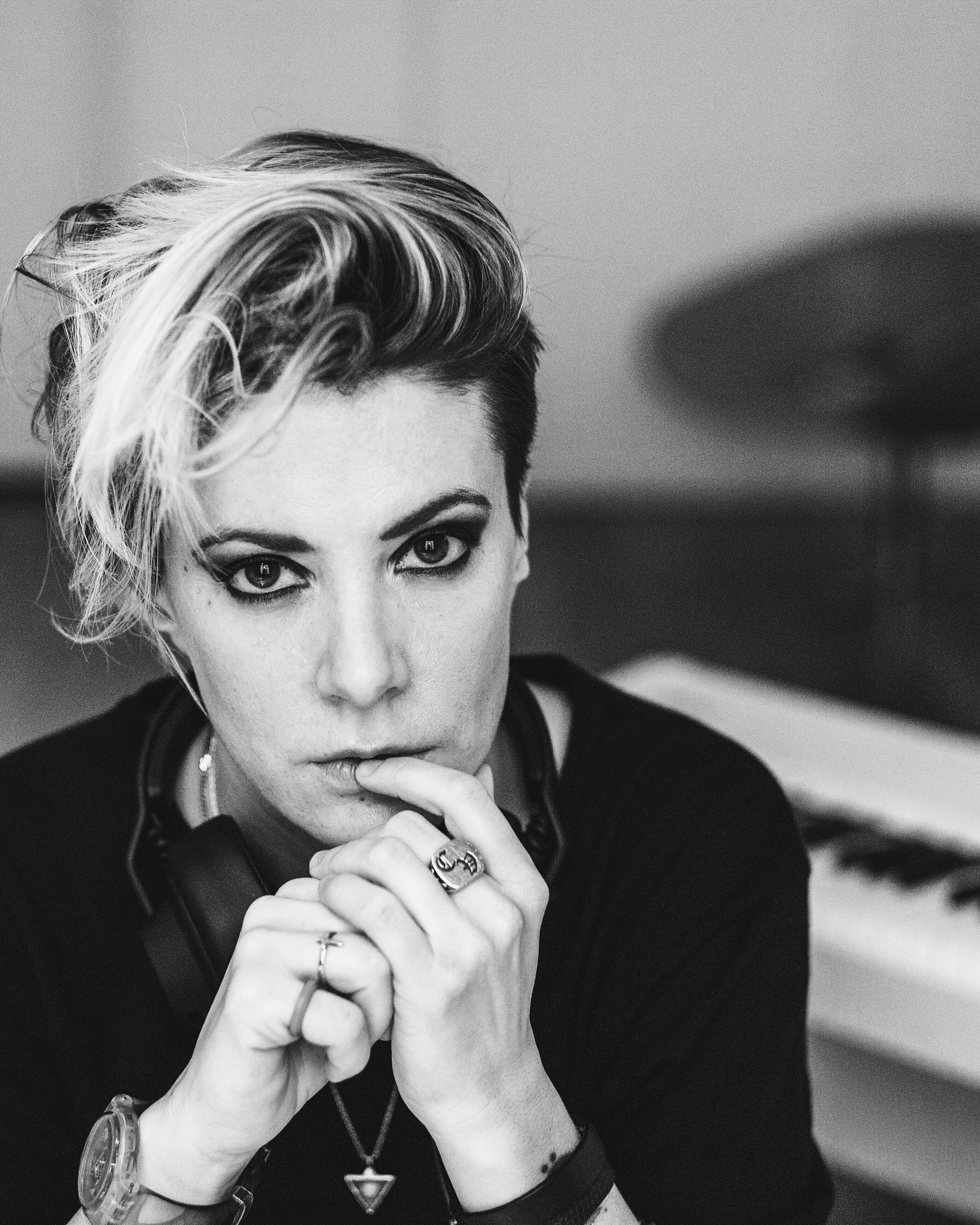

Background information
- Born: Lecco, Italy
- Genres: electronic and experimental music
- Occupations: Artist; Composer; Sound designer
- Website: www.chiaraluzzana.com

Chiara Luzzana is an Italian artist and composer, active in both the advertising and artistic fields. She is considered by critics one of the most innovative and visionary sound designers.

In 2014, she founded the project "The Sound of City". As director and composer, she records the sounds of cities and transforms them into soundtracks and multimedia installations.

== Early life and education ==
Born in Lecco, Luzzana began her musical studies when she was very young, first dedicating herself to the guitar, then to the clarinet and finally the piano. Not recognizing herself in the classical canons, she decides to abandon them and starting to make music using only noise.

In 2005, she became a sound engineer and later she studied at Berklee College of Music in Boston, Massachusetts, deepening her studies on the neurobiology of musical cognition and the production of soundtracks for films and advertisements.

== Career ==
Based between Milan and Shanghai, since 2010, she has divided her activity into two areas: composer of soundtracks for brands and advertisements and sound artist devoted to electronic and experimental music, using the noise as an instrument in her compositions.

She signed the soundtracks for many brands, including: Swatch, Lavazza, Alessi, Nivea, Costa Crociere, Martini; for each one she created the soundtrack starting from the original sound of the company, without musical instruments and transforming each sampling into a melody through the manipulation of the sound.

In 2012, Luzzana won the SoundtrART prize of the Fondazione Sandretto Re Rebaudengo with the opera Fragmento. She designed the soundtrack for the documentary Shapes made with the Fondazione Adriano Olivetti, using the sounds and reverberations of Olivetti machines; the documentary was previewed in Venice at the Biennale of Architecture 2012.

Between 2014 and 2015, she was an artist in residence at the Swatch Art Peace Hotel in Shanghai.

In 2015, she created for Swatch the project 60 BPM-The Sound Of Swatch, a composition made uniquely with the sound of over 2400 watches and their components. The project became a video documentary and a multimedia installation too, then presented at the Venice Biennale 2015 during the "Swatch Faces 2015" exhibition. In 2016 the project was a finalist at the Music+Sound Awards as "Best Sound Design" in the Online category, Viral + Ambient Advertising; in 2017 it won the MUSE Creative Awards in the Audio category as best soundtrack.

In 2017, she composed The Extra Ordinary Metal Orchestra for Alessi, transforming 16 design objects made of brass (trays, baskets, containers and fruit bowls) into an orchestra. For this project, Luzzana was inspired by the decoration of objects made by Alessi, decorated through a geometric motif generated by the Fibonacci sequence; also the soundtrack is the composition and transformation of sound following the Fibonacci sequence. In 2019, the opera won the MUSE Creative Awards in the Content Marketing category.

In 2019, Luzzana created the official Lavazza soundtrack, The Perfect Coffee Symphony, following through the sound the entire coffee production process, from Brazil where she recorded the first beans in the coffee plantations up to Turin in the factories and laboratories by Lavazza. The sound project was presented at the Rome Film Festival 2019. In Venice, Luzzana presented together with David Lachapelle the Lavazza 2020 Earth CelebrAction calendar, for the occasion she created the soundtrack that accompanied the photographer's shots. During the Milan Furniture Fair 2019, collaborating with the Balich Worldwide Shows, she signed the outdoor audio-installation dedicated to the 500th anniversary of the death of Leonardo da Vinci entitled Aqua: the Vision of Leonardo. At Fuorisalone her Denim Soundscape soundtrack accompanied the "Isko Denim Sound Textures" project, which was selected for the exhibition at the Design Link festival in Osaka. For the XXII Triennale di Milano, she donated the work Haiti Sounds created with the sounds of the Haiti children's hospital to the Fondazione Francesca Rava.

In 2020, she participated in the "Nice to meet you" exhibition promoted by SEA Aeroporti di Milano and curated by MEET Digital Culture Center Milano with The Sound of Milano, an interactive installation that allows the visitor to remix the sounds of the city and which is destined to remain in the airport.

== The Sound of City ==
In 2014, Luzzana conceived the project "The Sound of City". She records the sounds of the main cities of the world with the aim of transforming them into soundtracks, using the cities as musical instruments. In November 2016, she presented the preview of the project inside the Swatch Art Peace Hotel, during the Shanghai Biennale.

In addition to the sound part, Luzzana shoots the videos of the sound recordings of the cities to create a documentary that will be released on the major streaming platforms.

== Artistic style ==
Luzzana creates music using only sounds or noises. After her initial classical studies she abandoned musical instruments to overturn the classical musical canons and devote herself to experimentation. Her compositional approach is a new method that she invented from scratch. Among her inspirers are Luciano Berio and John Cage, Stockhausen and all the experimental avant-garde of Cologne, Luigi Russolo and Pierre Schaeffer.

== Exhibitions ==
- 2012, Venice, Biennale of Architecture 2012, "Shapes"
- 2015, Venice, Venice Biennale 2015, "60 BPM - The Sound Of Swatch"
- 2019:
  - Milan, Fuorisalone, "Aqua: Leonardo's Vision"
  - Osaka, Design Link, "Denim Soundscape"
  - Milan, Triennale di Milano, "Haiti Sounds"
- 2020, Milan-Malpensa Airport, Nice to meet you, "The Sound of Milan"
- 2021, Milan, MEET, "MEET The Symphony"

== Awards ==
- 2012, SoundtrART prize of the Sandretto Re Rebaudengo Foundation for the opera "Fragmento"
- 2017, wins the MUSE Creative Awards (International Advertising Awards) in the Audio category, for the work "60 BPM - The Sound Of Swatch"
- 2019, wins the MUSE Creative Awards (International Advertising Awards) in the Content Marketing category, for the work "The Extraordinary Metal Collection"

== See also ==
- Noise music
