= Henry Massonnet =

French designer and politician (1922 - 2005)

- Born: January 6, 1922; Oyonnax, France
- Died: December 27, 2005 (aged 83); Bourg-en-Bresse, France
- Resting place: Nurieux-Volognat, France

Henry Massonnet (6 January 1922 – 27 December 2005) was a French designer and politician. He was known for designing the Fauteuil 300 chair, which is regarded as the predecessor to the Monobloc.

== Biography ==
Massonnet was born in Oyonnax, France. In 1948, he assumed control of his family business, "Stamp", and developed a new plastic moulding technique. In 1965, he was elected mayor of Mornay. In 1968, he created the Tam Tam, a hyperbolic plastic chair which quickly became successful in France between 1968 and 1980, 12 million units were sold at an initial price of 15 Francs. He led the merger of Mornay and Volognat. The two communes became Nurieux-Volognat in 1973, where Massonnet served as the first mayor until 1982.
