= I29 =

I29 may refer to:

- Interstate 29
- Japanese submarine I-29
