= Martí Guixé =

Spanish designer

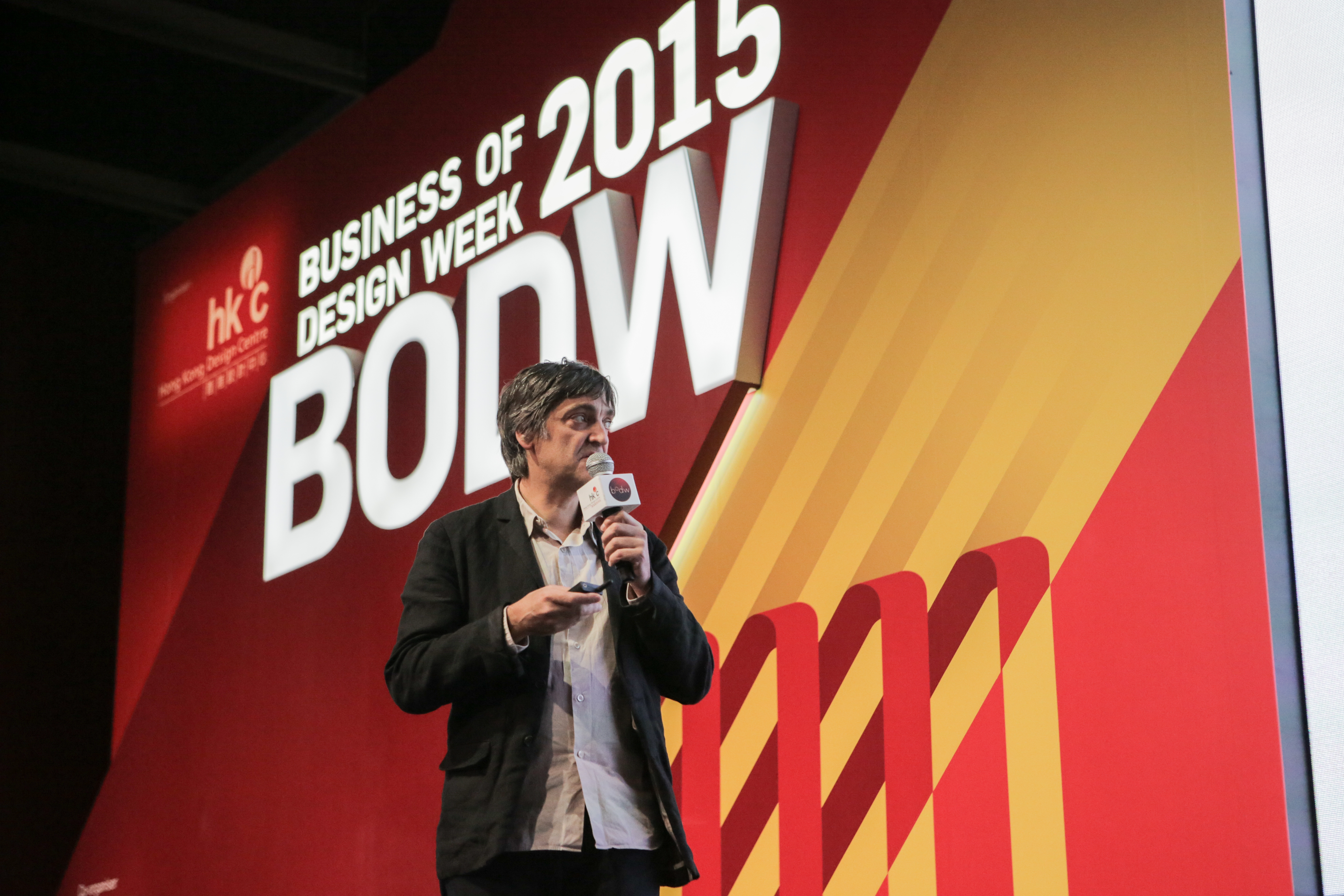
Barcelona Business of Design Week Martí Guixé alta-4195

Martí Guixé (born 1964) is a Spanish designer living in Barcelona and Berlin. He graduated in interior design from Elisava in Barcelona in 1985 and enrolled in an industrial design study program in Scuola Politecnica di Design di Milano in 1986. In 2001, as a statement against the limited scope of the traditional designer and to open new possibilities for the industry Guixé started an ex-designer movement, defining himself by the same name.

== Concept ==
Martí Guixé, Do frame, photo Inga Knoelke

Guixé is very outspoken in his dislike of design as stylized object and form. Rather than reshaping existing products Guixé’s work claims to alter ways of seeing and thinking. Design to Guixé needs to evoke constant evaluation of the parameters of function and active engagement and reinvention on the part of the consumer. It should be firmly rooted in contemporary experience and not longer in past structures of functionality. Because of this critical and provocative attitude, his work is sometimes associated with the critical design movement, popularized by Fiona Raby and Anthony Dunne, but in general is more playful and less moralistic.

His non-objective approach is reflected in the frequent use of disposable or cheap materials and the quick and ephemeral character of much of his work. The final design often seems only one outcome of innumerable possibilities.

There are several products in which the shape is not important and the function is more important. I think the way to do that is working basically with ideas, so that the shapes and materials become anecdotal.

== Design as platform ==
An integrated part of Guixés conceptual approach is his interest in design as a platform for questioning, visualising and influencing contemporary human behaviour. With a focus on patterns of consumption, exchange of information and the process of choice.

We will see a growth in the number of consumer-curators, personal consumer assistants or, speaking of information, interactive consumption interfaces. What is actually happening at the moment is that some of the people doing this are becoming the brand. It is the interface that is supposed to give you confidence in what you consume and not so much the product.

As a consequence the designer's obligation is not just towards the design itself but to how it becomes part of systems of consumption.

== Food Design ==
Guixés sensitivity towards materials that are quick, readily available and oriented towards mass consumption led him to become an important innovator in food design. He understood food design as a way to re-evaluate and redesign the structure around food, the industry and the consumer. Void from nostalgia, food for Guixé is primarily an edible designed product, an object that negates any reference to cooking, tradition and gastronomy.

I am only interested in food, as I consider it is a mass consumption product and I like the fact that it is a product that disappears – by ingestion – and is transformed into energy.

For many years food has no longer been a necessity but a consumer product.

Most of my food projects are not commercial, but are a way of defining a new perception of this kind of product.

== Commercial work ==
Martí Guixé, Camper Walk in Progress Shop system, Milan 2000, photo Inga Knoelke

Martí Guixé, HiBYE Card, 2001, photo Inga Knoelke

In spite of his critical attitude Guixé designs products because, as he claims himself, he needs them. Among his clients are: Alessi, Authentics, Camper, Chupa Chups, Corraini, DAMM, Danese, Dentsu, Desigual, Drill, Droog Design, Galeria H2O Barcelona, Imaginarium, Kesselskramer, Mediamatic, Magis, Nanimarquina, Rome Film Festival, Saporiti Italia, Trico, Vitra.

== Non-commercial work ==
Guixé's work already early in his career aroused the interest of the art field. His designs, installations and performances have been shown in many international group shows as well as solo projects, Among them MOMA, Centre Georges Pompidou, Design Museum London, Centre d'Art Contemporain Genève, National Art Center Tokyo, Museum für angewandte Kunst, La Galleria Nazionale d'Arte Moderna.

== Books ==
- Fish Futures Galeria H20 Editorial 1998
- Martí Guixé 1:1. 010 publishers 2002
- Food Design. Galeria H20 Editorial 2003
- Context free, including the Kitchen Buildings. Birkhauser 2003
- Martí Guixé, Cook Book. Imschoot publishers 2004
- Martí Guixé, Food Designing. Corraini Edizioni 2010
- Dream Factories – People, ideas and paradoxes of Italian design. Mondadori Electa 2011
- Kubabook (Martí Guixé and Inga Knölke).NAME Publications 2012
- R&D Book. Corraini Edizioni 2012
- Martí Guixé, Transition Menu – reviewing creative gastronomy. Corraini Edizioni 2013
- Don't buy it if you don't need it. All Martí Guixe's Camper Commodityscapes. Camper 2007
- Casa Mondo: Food. Unevaluated Essays. Corraini Edizioni 2021
- Trilogy. On Flower Power.Intertwingled. Food Age. La Galleria Nazionale, Rome. Corraini Edizioni 2023
- Ex-Designer Project Bar. Unevaluated Essays. Corraini Edizioni 2024

== Awards ==
- INFAD medal of interior design, Barcelona (1985)
- Ciutat de Barcelona Design Award (1999)
- National Design Award of the Generalitat de Catalunya (2007)
- Innovative Media Prize and Special Prize for Innovative Marketing, Vuoden Huiput Awards, Finland (2011)
- Design PLUS ISM, Frankfurt (2011)
- Ephemeral Architecture FAD International Award, Barcelona (2014)
- Graffica Design Prize, Santander (2017)
- Design Award of the Madrid Design Festival (2018)
