= Alessi (Italian company) =

Italian kitchen utensil manufacturer

Alessi S.p.A. – Società Benefit
- Type: Private
- Industry: Housewares; industrial design
- Founded: 1921
- Founder: Giovanni Alessi
- Headquarters: Omegna (Crusinallo), Piedmont, Italy
- Area served: Worldwide
- Key people: Alberto Alessi (president); Alberto Camerlengo (CEO, 2024– )
- Products: Kitchenware, tableware, small home accessories
- Owners: Alessi family (60%); Iconic Holdco (UK) Ltd. (40%)
- Website: Official website

Alessi S.p.A. is an Italian design-led housewares manufacturer based in Omegna, Piedmont. Founded by Giovanni Alessi in 1921, the company became known for collaborating with architects and industrial designers to produce iconic everyday objects, and many Alessi products are held in museum collections worldwide. In 2020 Alessi became a legally recognised società benefit (benefit corporation) and is also a Certified B Corporation.

== History ==
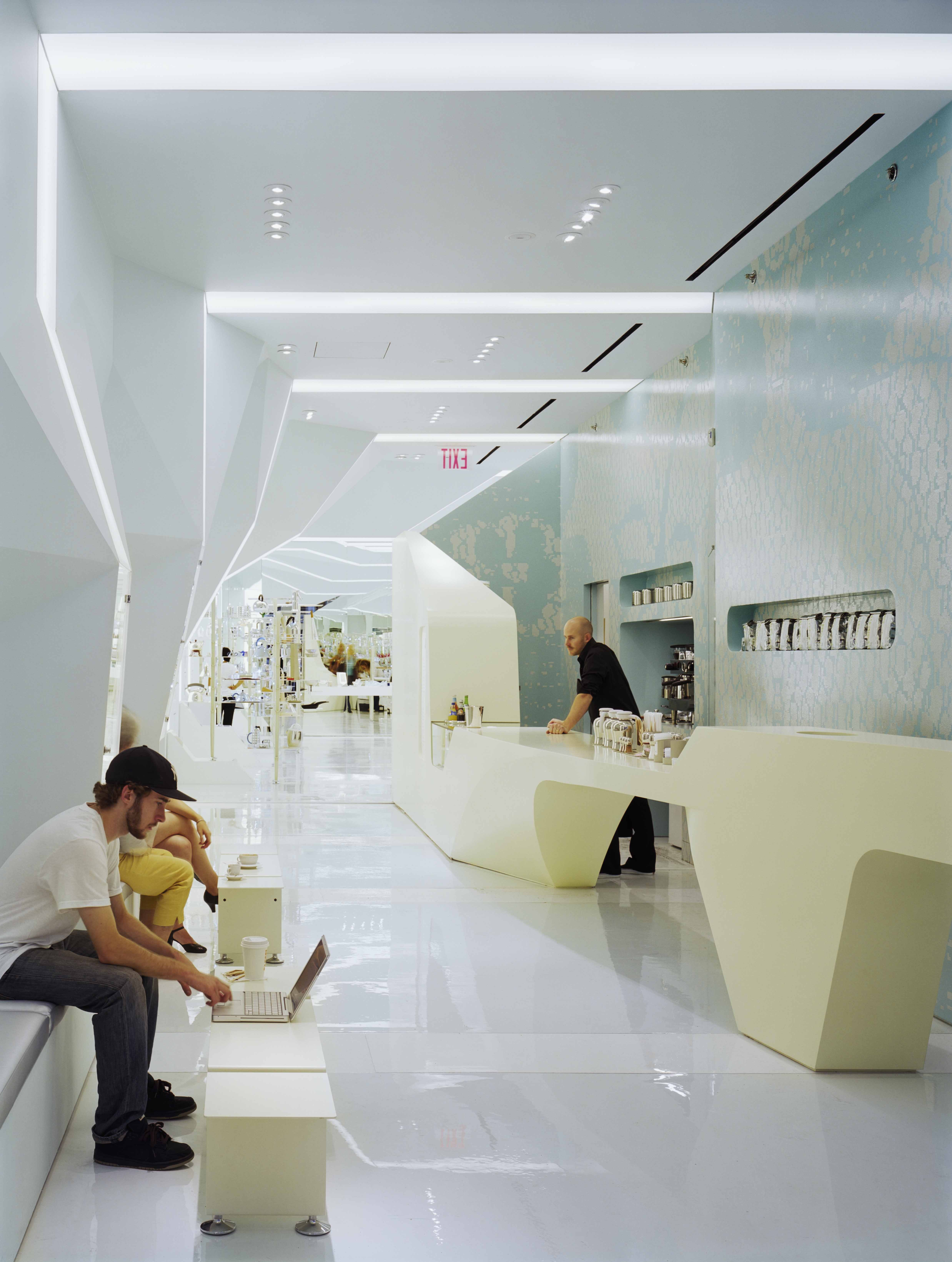
Alessi flagship store, New York City

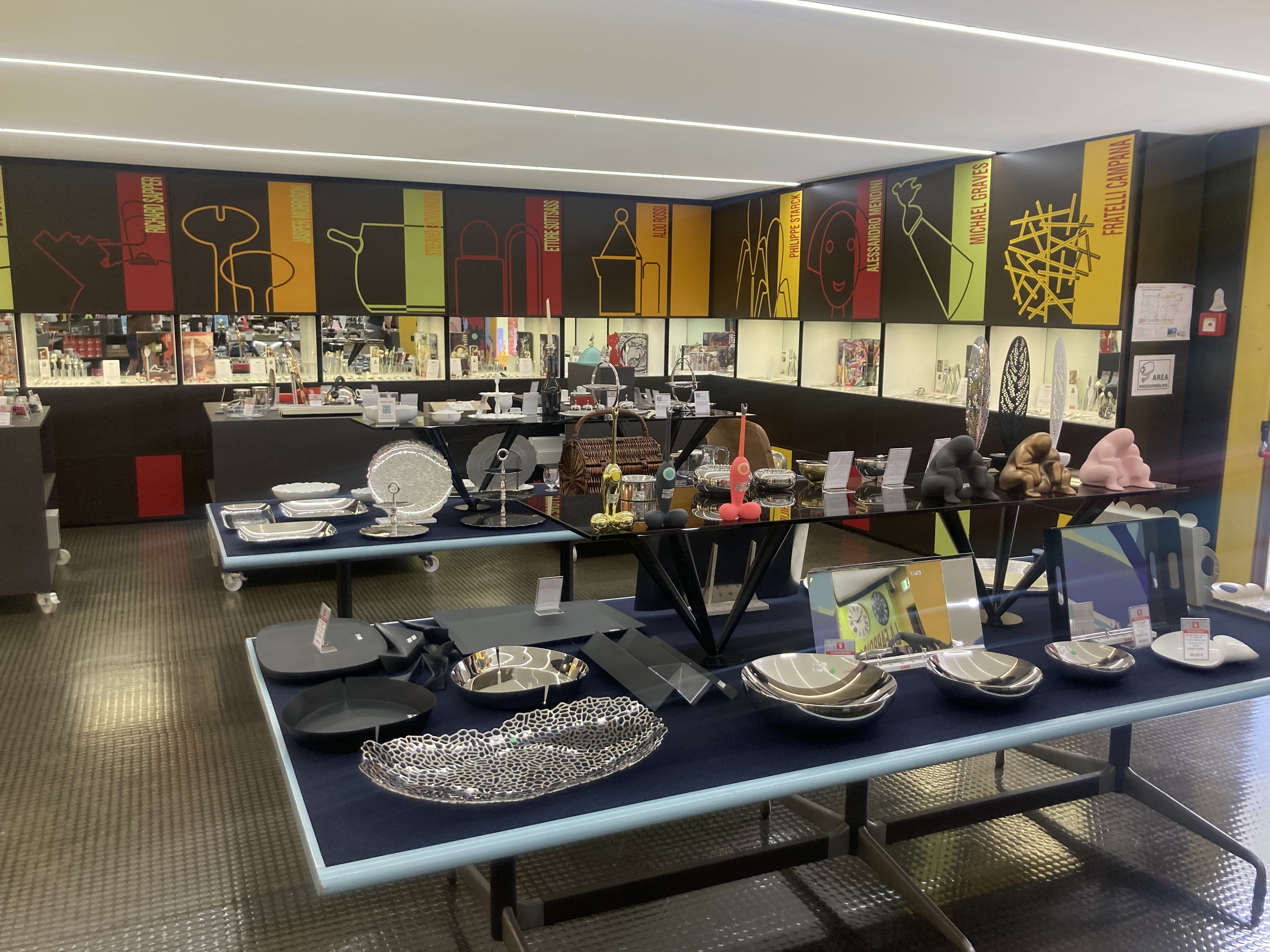
Interior of Alessi factory outlet store in Omegna, Italy

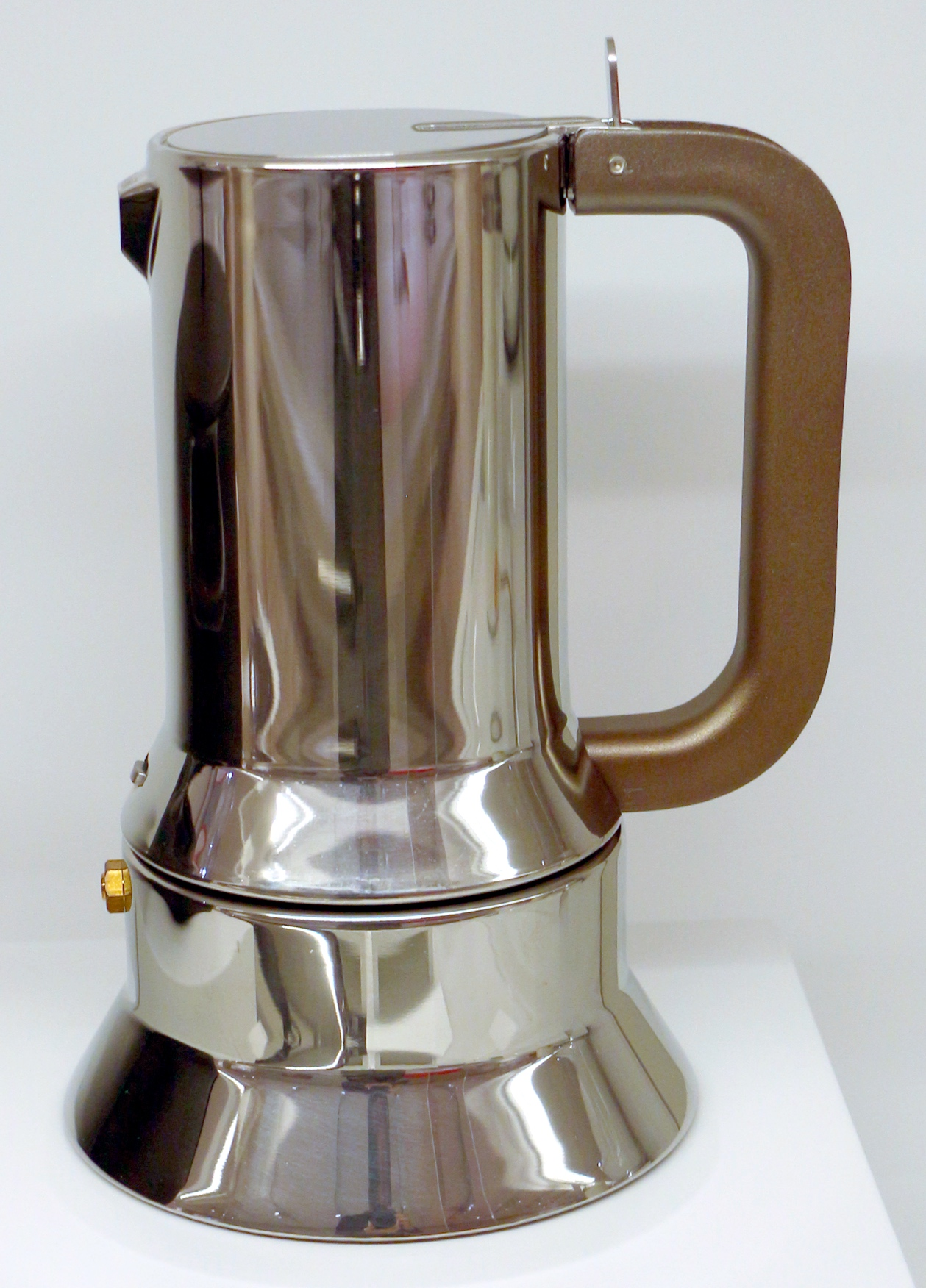
Coffee pot by Richard Sapper (1978)

Alessi was founded in 1921 by Giovanni Alessi who was born in Italy and raised in Switzerland. A few years after World War I, Alessi started producing a wide range of tableware items in nickel, chromium and silver-plated brass. The company began when Carlo Alessi (born 1916), the son of Giovanni, was named chief designer. Between 1935 and 1945 he developed most of the products Alessi released.

=== 1950s and 1960s ===
In 1969 the company was under the leadership of Carlo Alessi. It was his brother Luigi who introduced the collaboration with external designers in 1955. With some architects, he designed several items that were created for the hotel needs. He helped introduce many best-sellers, such as the historical series of wire baskets. From 1957 by Luigi Massaroni and Carlo Mazzeri. This was designed in a series with an Ice bucket and Ice tongs as part of the Program 4 for the 11 Triennale in Milan. This was the first time that the Alessi products got shown with manufactured goods. The 1950s were a difficult time as it was only a few years after World War II and many people could not afford to buy designer objects.

=== 1970s and 1980s ===
In 1970, Alberto Alessi was responsible for the third transformation of the company. Alessi was considered one of the "Italian Design Factories". In this decade under the leadership of Alberto Alessi the company collaborated with some design maestros like Achille Castiglioni, Richard Sapper, Alessandro Mendini, and Ettore Sottsass. In the 1970s, Alessi produced the Condiment set (salt, pepper and toothpicks) by Sottsass, the Espressomaker by Sapper.

The 1980s marked a period in which Italian design factories had to compete with mass production. These movements had a different view on design, for the Italian design factories the design and therefore the designer was the most important part of the process while for the mass production the design had to be functional and easy to be reproduced. Also in the 1980s, they changed their marketing image from factory to industrial research lab, a place for research and production. For Alessi the 1980s are marked with some designs like the Two tone kettle by Sapper, their first cutlery set Dry by Castiglioni. Alessi collaborated with new designers, including Aldo Rossi, Michael Graves, and Philippe Starck, who have been responsible for the some of Alessi's all-time bestsellers like the kettle with a bird whistle by Graves.

Alessi faced increasing competition from other international manufacturers, especially in lower-cost products mass-produced for retailers such as Target Corporation, J. C. Penney and John Lewis & Partners.

=== 1990s ===
In the 1990s, Alessi started to work more with plastics, at the request of designers who found it an easier material to work with than metal, offering more design freedom and innovative possibilities. The 1990s were marked by the theme "Family Follows Fiction", with playful and imaginative objects. Artists designing for this theme included Stefano Giovannoni and Alessandro Mendini, who designed Fruit Mama and the bestseller Anna G. Metal still remained a popular material, for example the Girotondo family by King Kong.

=== 2000s ===
During the 2000s, Alessi collaborated with several architects for its "coffee and tea towers", with a new generation of architects, including Wiel Arets, Zaha Hadid, Toyo Ito, Greg Lynn, MVRDV, Jean Nouvel, and UN Studio. These sets had a limited production of 99 copies. Another design in the 2000s was the Blow Up series by Fratelli Campana. The brothers played with form and shape to create baskets and other objects that look like they would fall apart when touched.

In 2006, the company reclassified its products under three lines: "A di Alessi", "Alessi", and "Officina Alessi". A di Alessi is more "democratic" and more "pop", the lower price range of Alessi. Officina Alessi is more exclusive, innovative, and experimental, marked by small-batch production series and limited series.

In 2007, Hani Rashid and Lise Anne Couture Asymptote Architecture (New York) designed the New York city flagship store for Alessi in the SoHo neighborhood on Greene Street. The space featured an Alessi gallery, espresso bar and retail in a renovated historic loft building. Asymptote was responsible for not only the interior design of the space but also branding and the graphic identity, updating Alessi's image from its 1980s Postmodern style to a contemporary architectural ethos.

Alessi products are on display in museums worldwide, including the Museum of Modern Art (New York), the Metropolitan Museum of Art, the Victoria and Albert Museum, the Pompidou Centre, the Design Museum Holon, and the Stedelijk Museum Italy. A collaboration with the National Palace Museum of Taiwan produced a collection of various kitchenware products with Asian themes.

== Designers and their designs ==
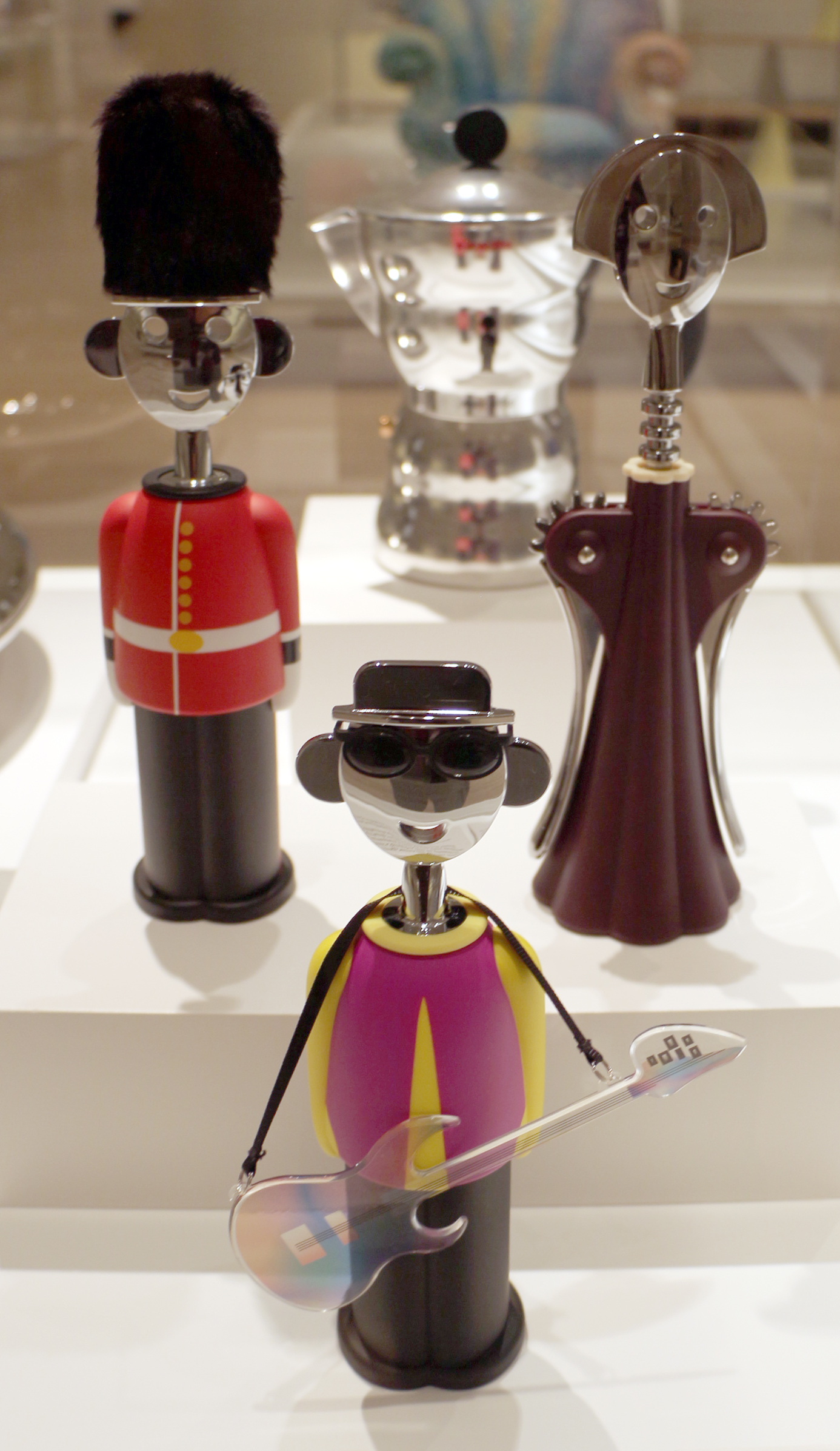
Anna G tableware

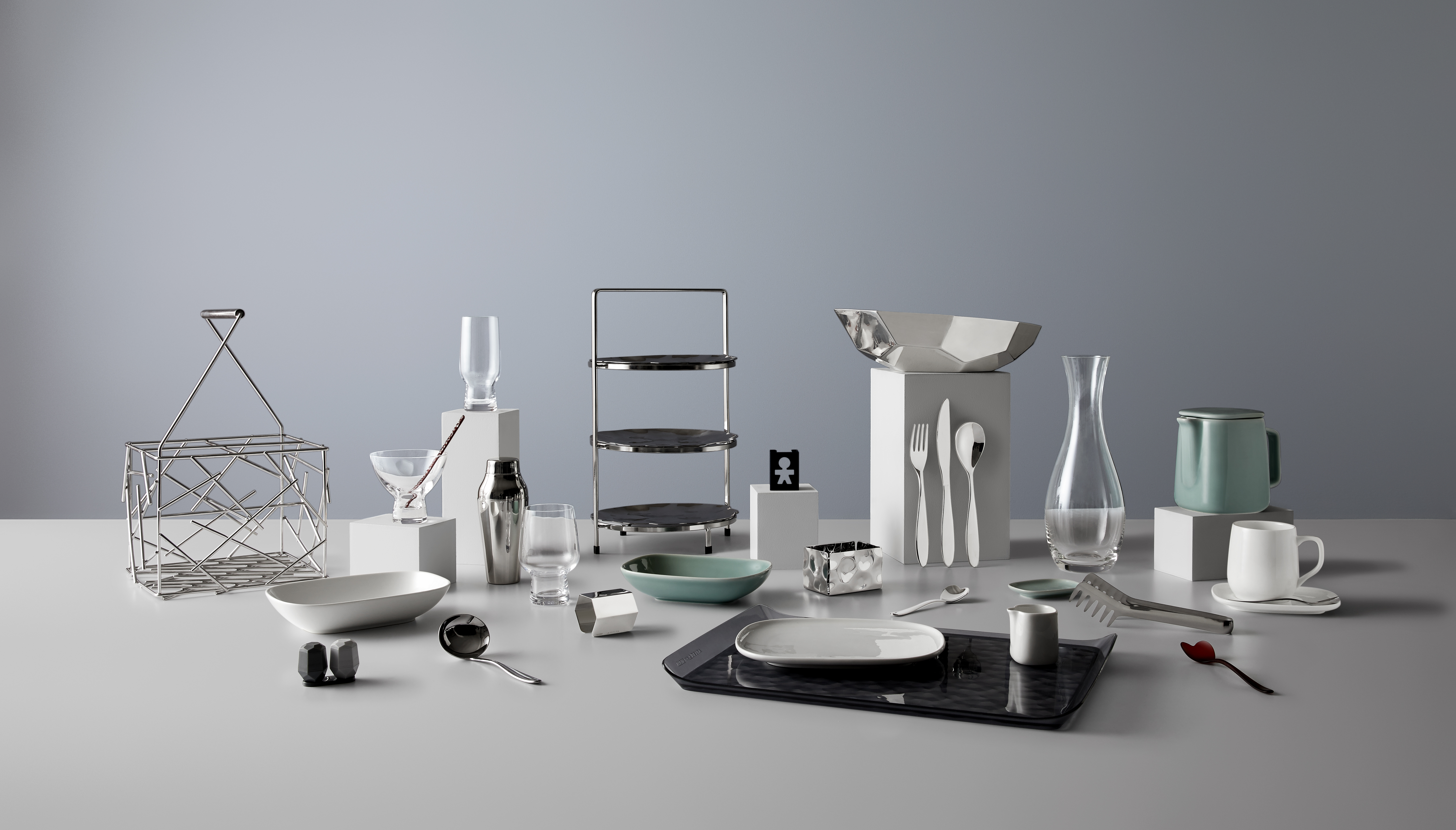
Tableware collaboration between Alessi and Delta

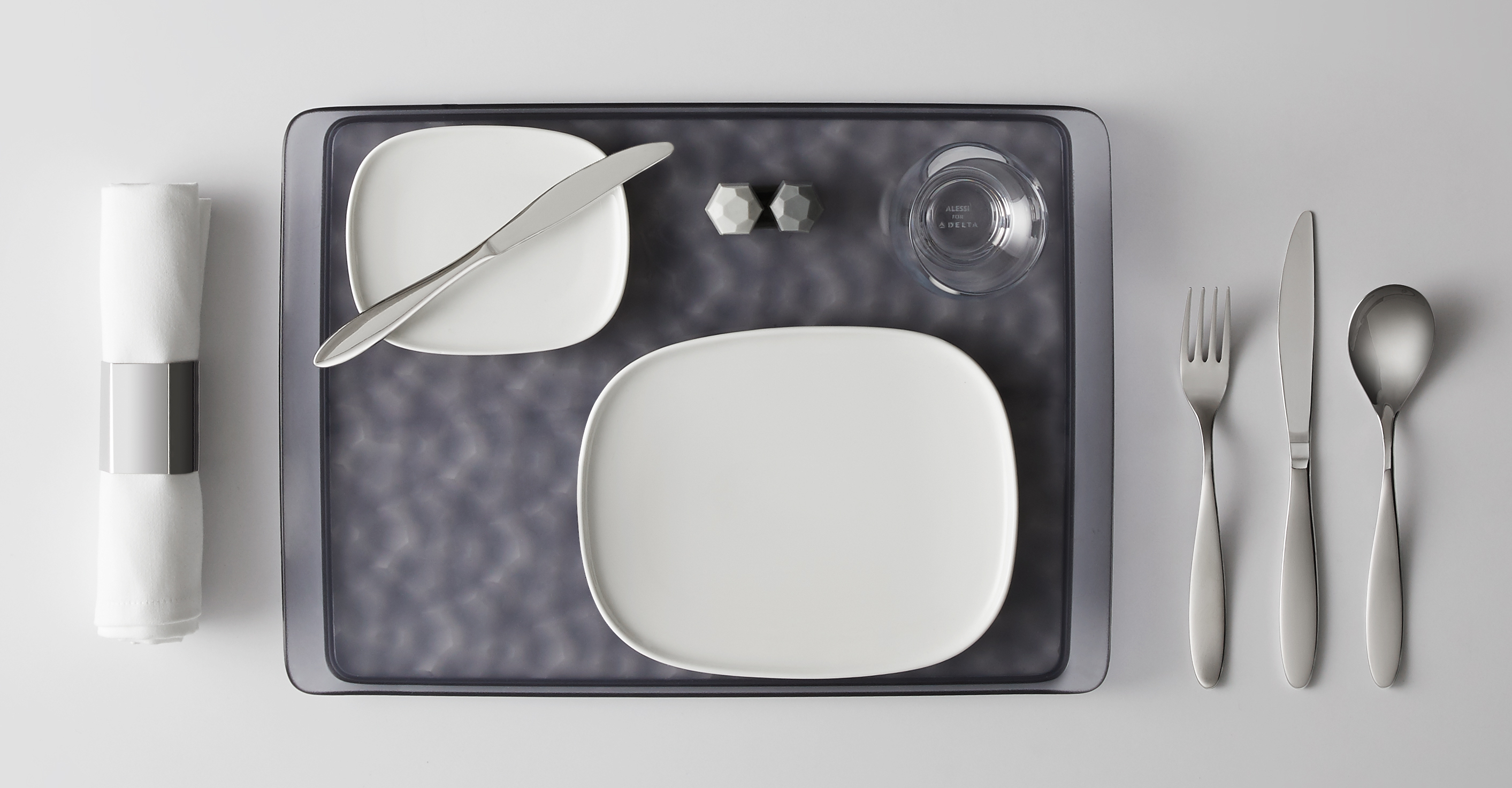
Delta inflight service (another view)

From 1945 until today, Alessi has collaborated with designers and even other brands or companies for their products. Some key designs and their designers:

- 1945 Bombé tea and coffee service by Carlo Alessi Anghini
- 1978 Condiment set (salt, pepper and toothpicks) by Ettore Sottsass
- 1979 Programma 5 barware by Ettore Sottsass
- 1979 9090 espresso maker by Richard Sapper. This design won the first Compasso d'Oro award for Alessi.
- 1982 Dry flatware/cutlery by Achille Castiglioni the first cutlery produced by Alessi
- 1983 Bollitore whistling water kettle by Richard Sapper. Alessi's first "designer kettle", with a whistle whose pipe sings two tones, mi and si, in harmony
- 1984 La Conica by Aldo Rossi. This was Rossi's first mass-production design and its image earned immediate success for the then-new Officina Alessi brand, as well as becoming a 1980s design symbol. Therefore, it was soon to be followed by more Rossi designs in this theme.
- 1985 Kettle by Michael Graves. The Graves' kettle is known for its singing bird when the water boils. Followed by matching products like a sugar bowl and a creamer, also designed by Graves. This product has sold the greatest number of units in the history of the company.
- 1987 Nuovo Milano cutlery set designed by Ettore Sottsass with assistance of Alberto Gozzi. Won XVIth Compasso d'oro award in 1991.
- 1988 Pito kettle by Frank Gehry
- 1989 Girotondo family by King-Kong
- 1989 Hot Bertaa kettle by Philippe Starck
- 1990 Juicy Salif by Philippe Starck
- 1993 Fruit Mama by Stefano Giovannoni. The first design for the Family Follows Fiction series; noteworthy for its aesthetic juxtaposition of plastic and stainless steel.
- 1994 Anna G corkscrew by Alessandro Mendini. A best seller since it was first produced, with its smiling face, it engendered the Anna family of related objects for the table and kitchen.
- 1995 Mary Biscuit by Stefano Giovannoni. Biscuit or cookie container.
- 1997 Nono di Antonio garlic crusher by Guido Venturini
- 2004 Blow Up range of baskets and citrus holders by Fratelli Campana
- 2006 Kaj watch by Karim Rashid
- 2013 Dressed dinnerware and flatware by Marcel Wanders
- 2015 Collo Alto cutlery set by Inga Sempé
- 2017 Forma cheese grater by Zaha Hadid
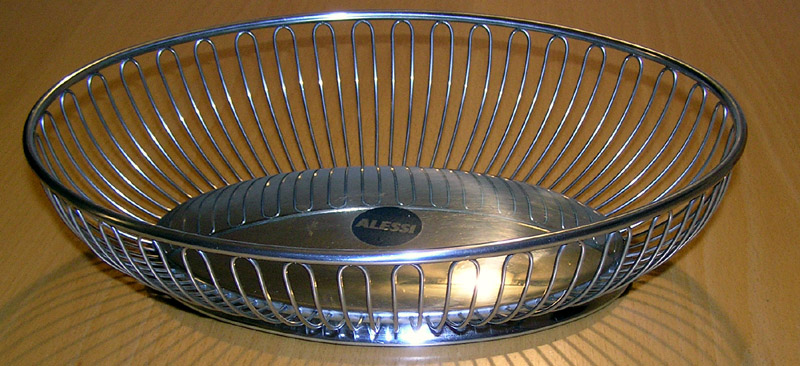
Oval breadbasket, 1955

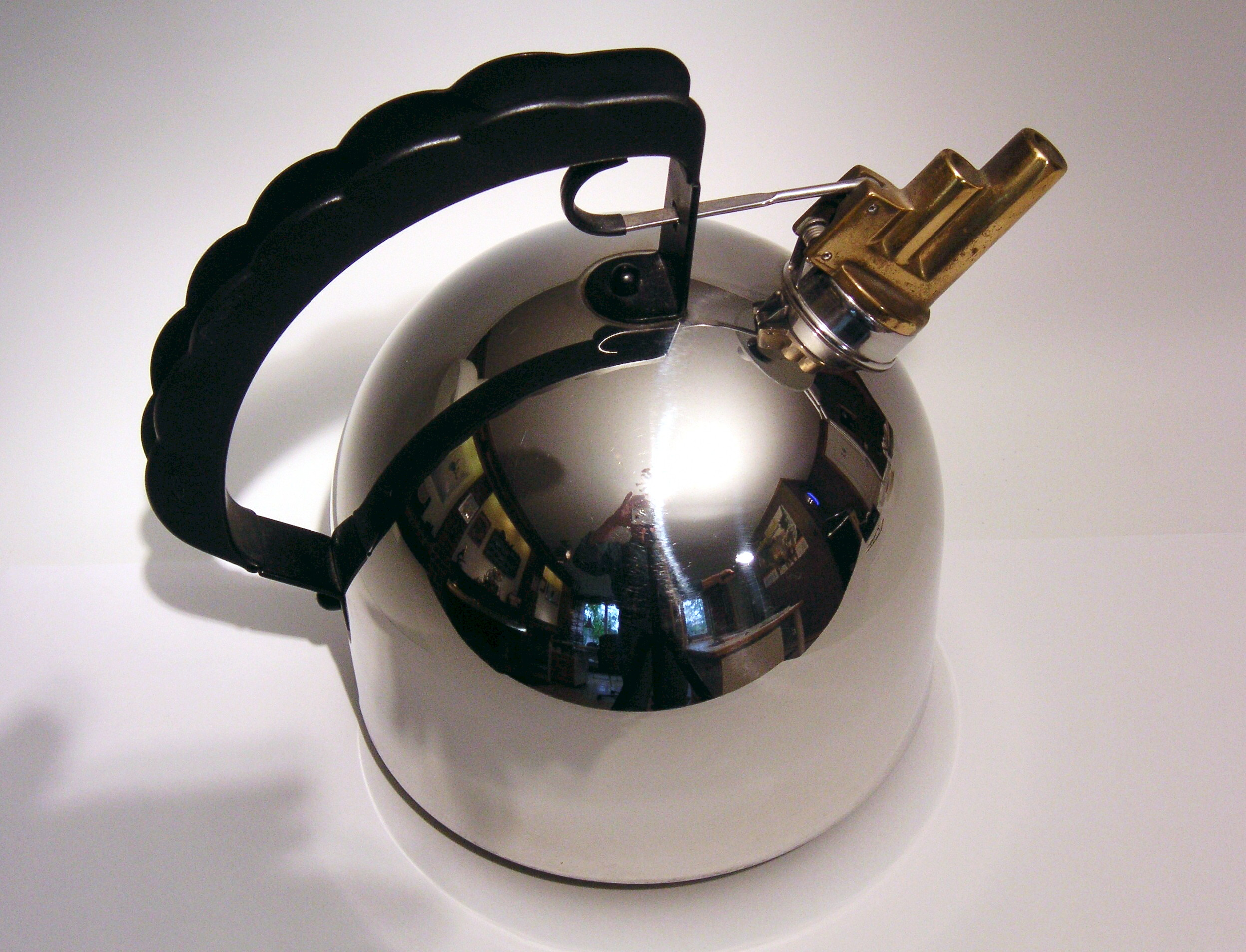
Sapper kettle, 1983

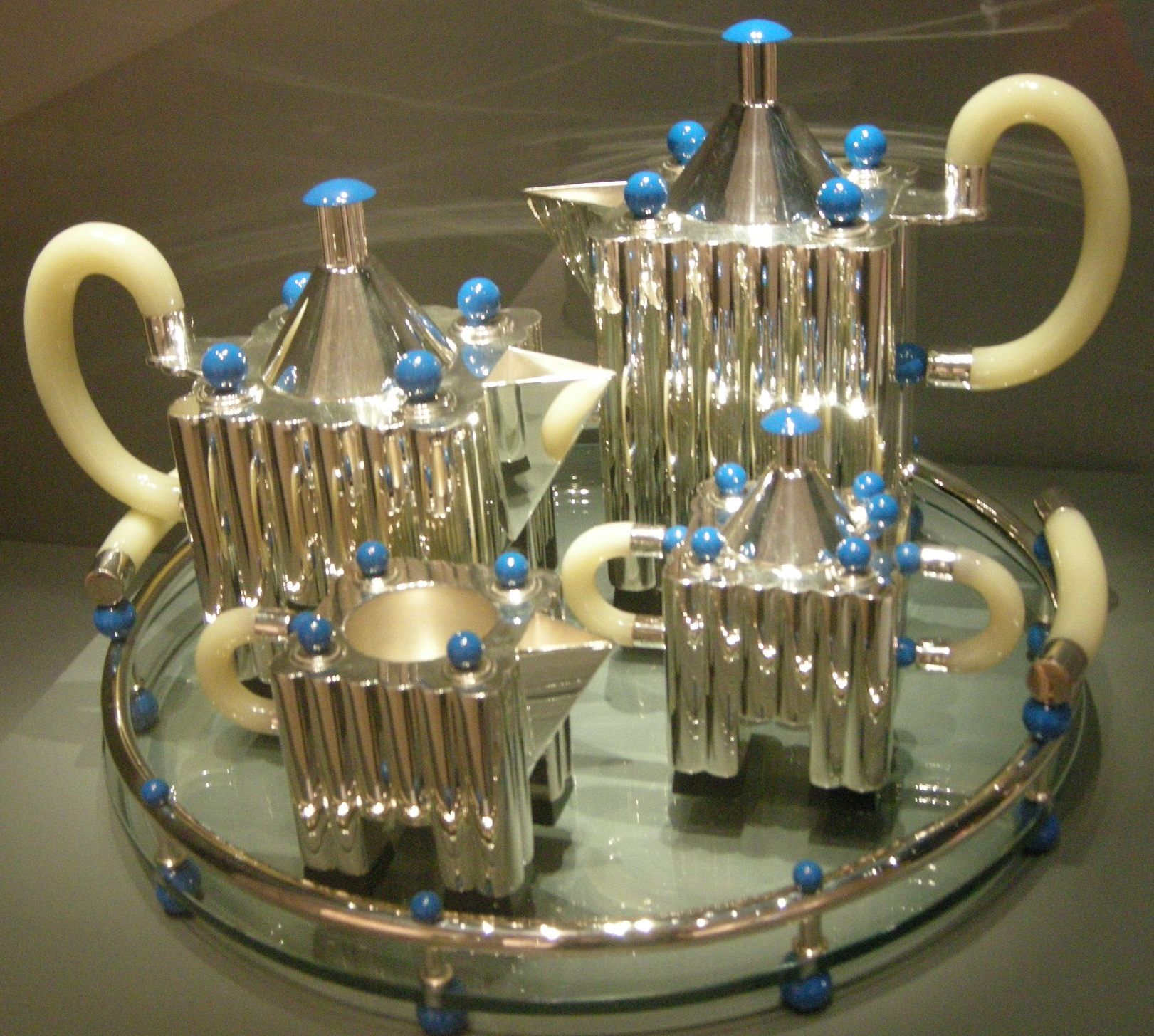
Graves tea service, 1983

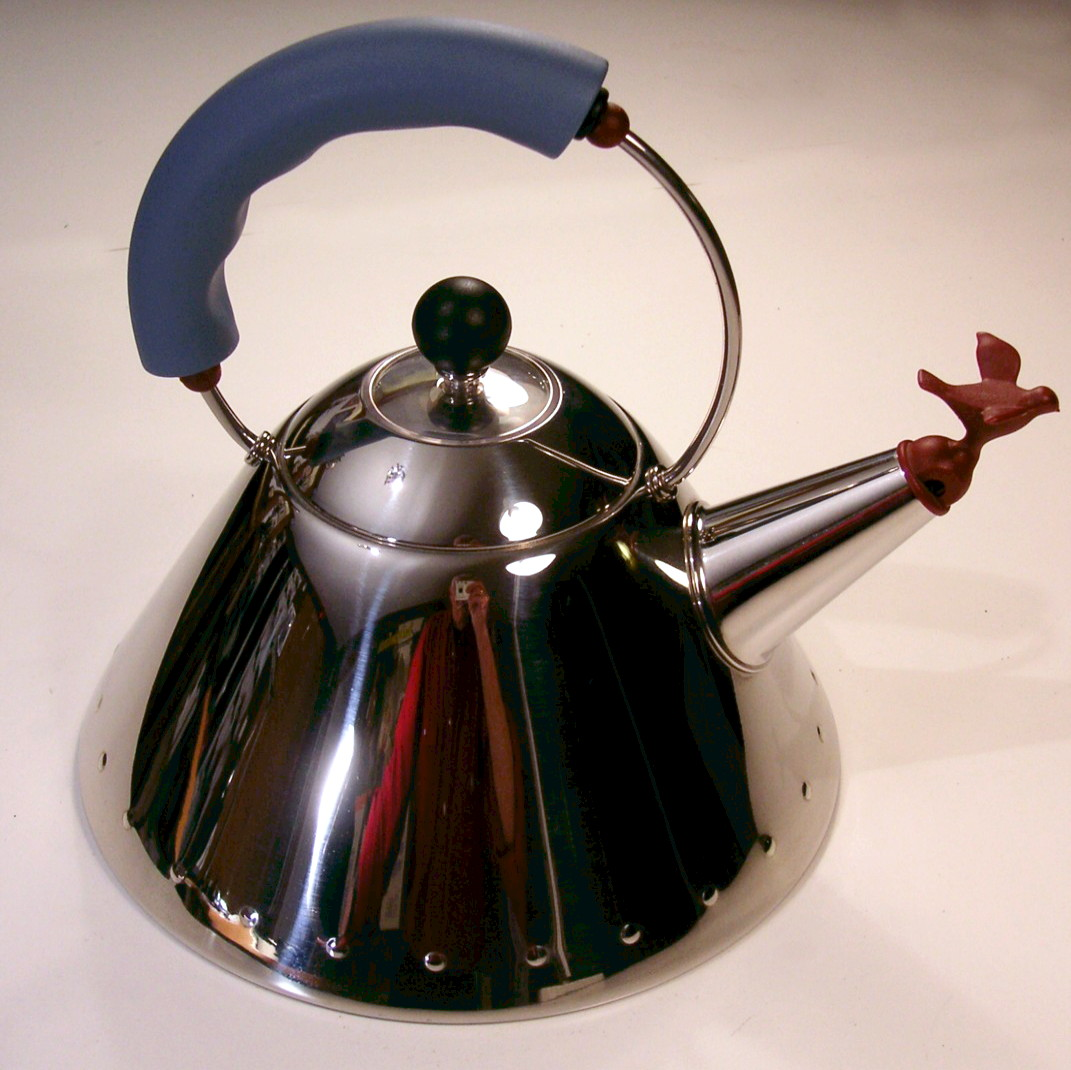
Graves kettle, 1984

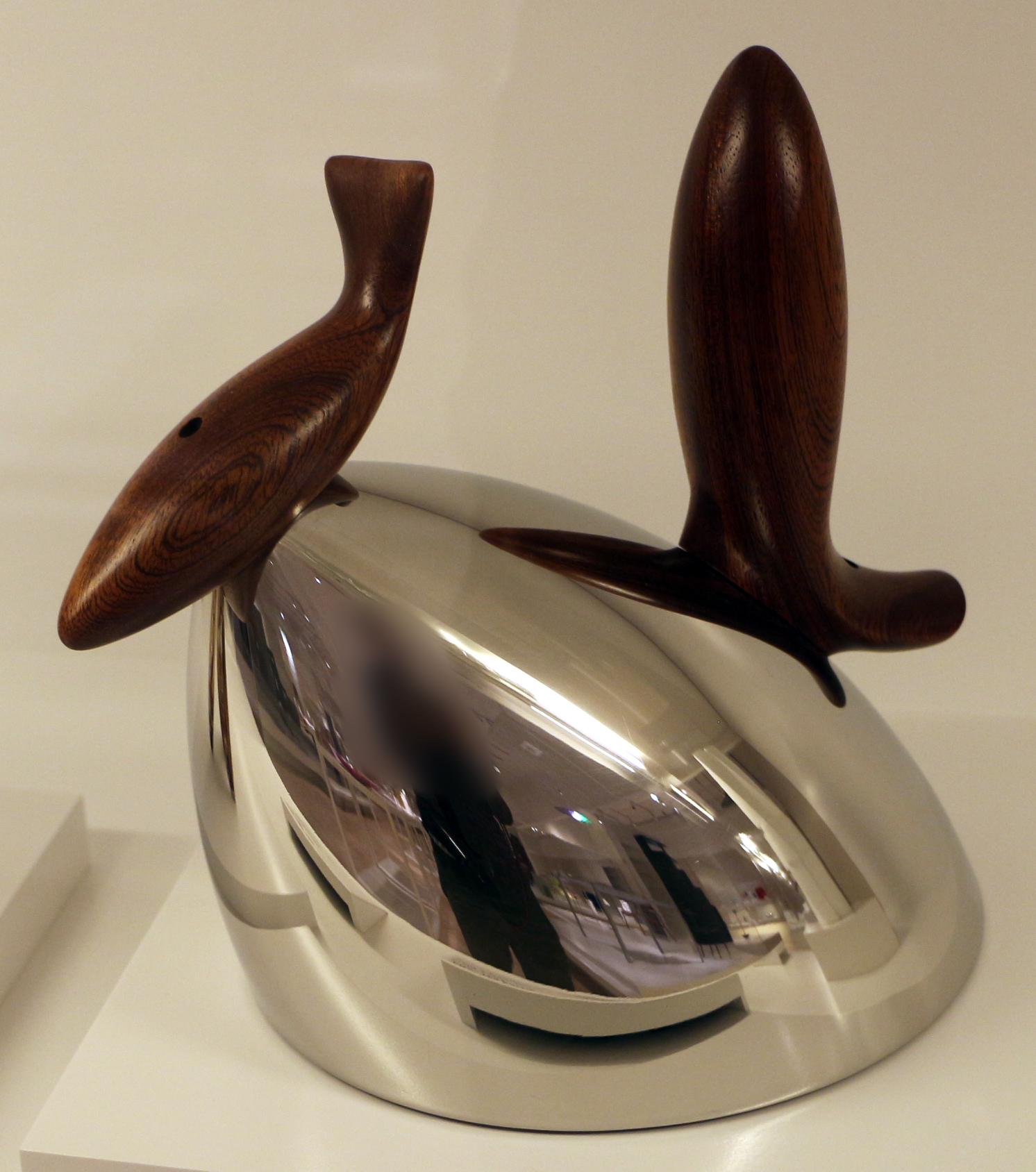
Pito kettle, 1988

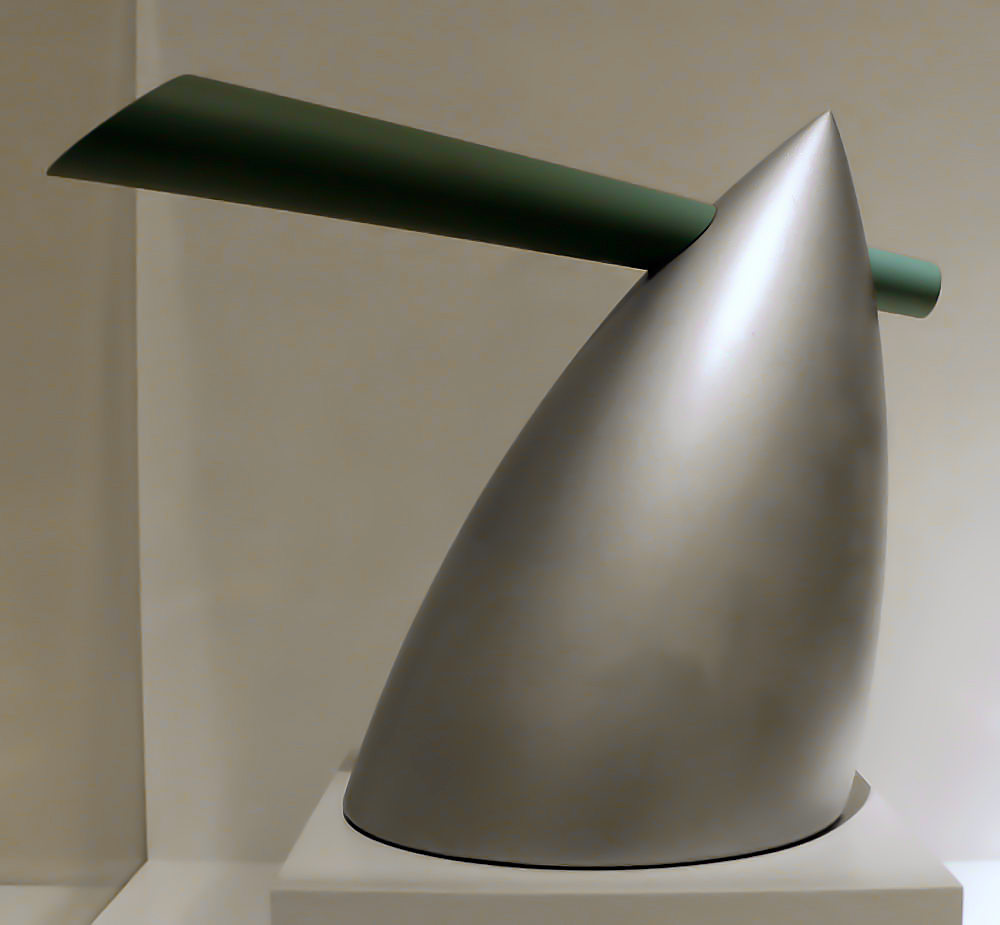
Hot Bertaa kettle, 1989

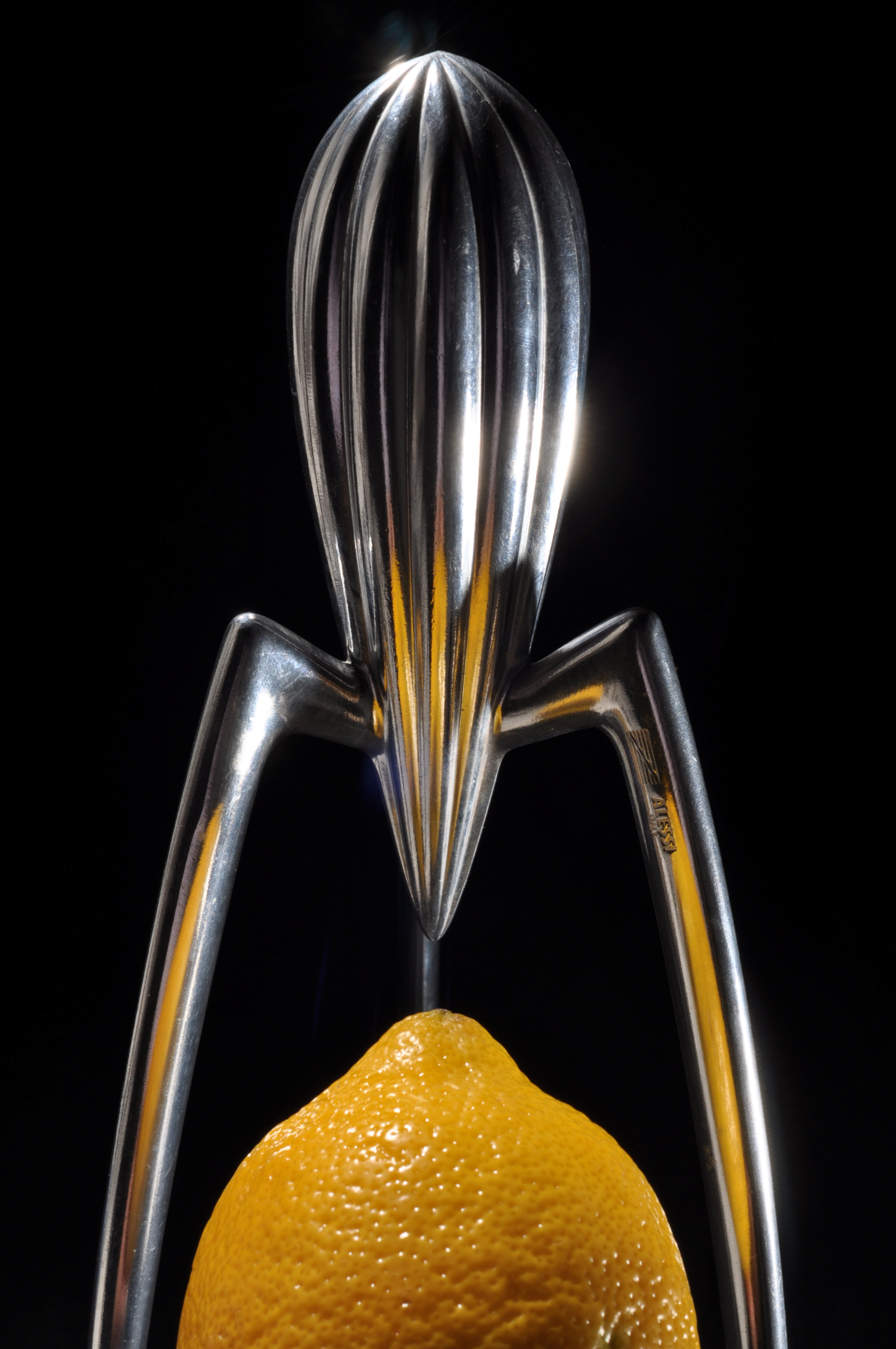
Starck Juicy Salif citrus juicer, 1990

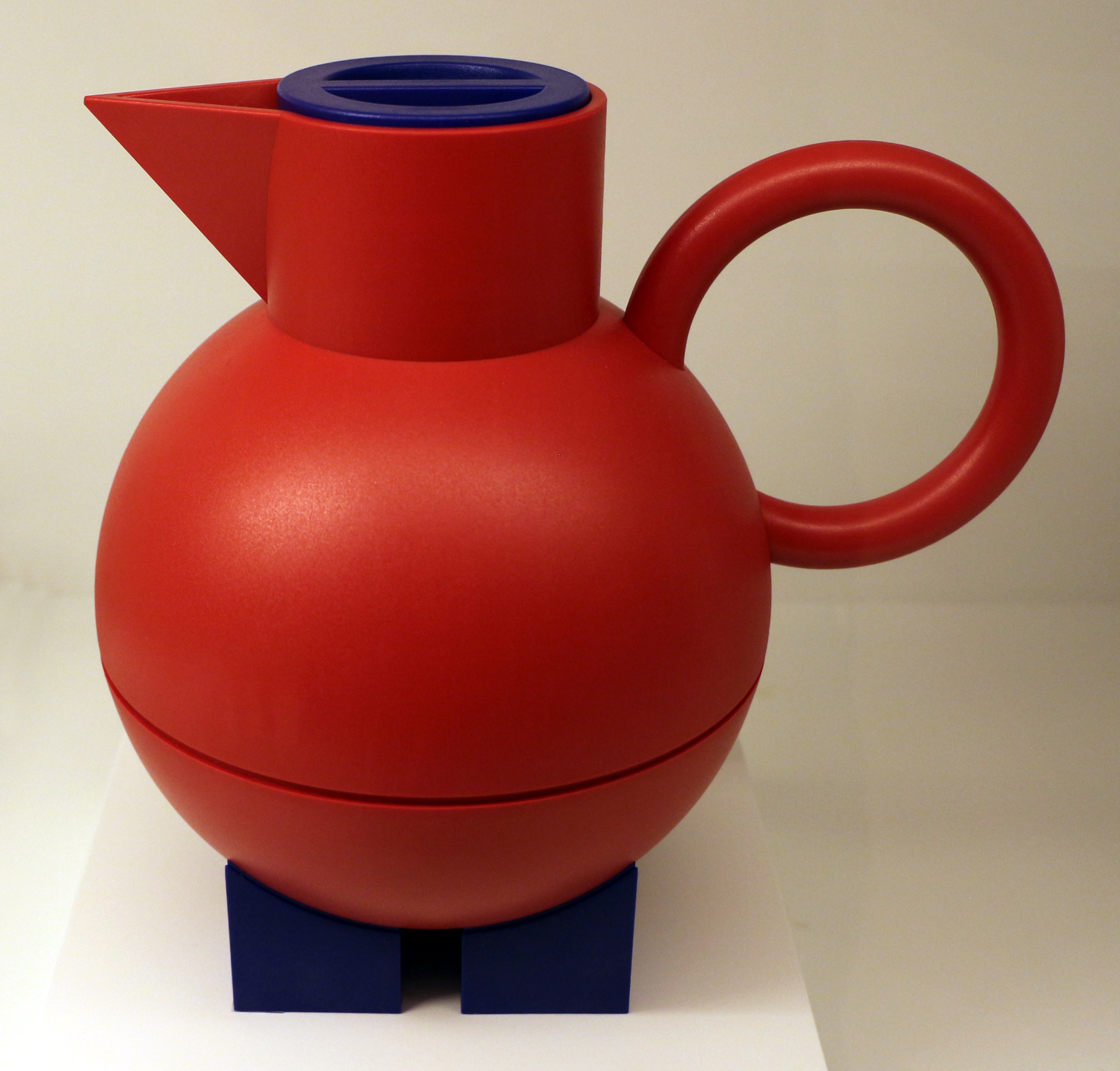
Carafe designed by Michael Graves, 1993

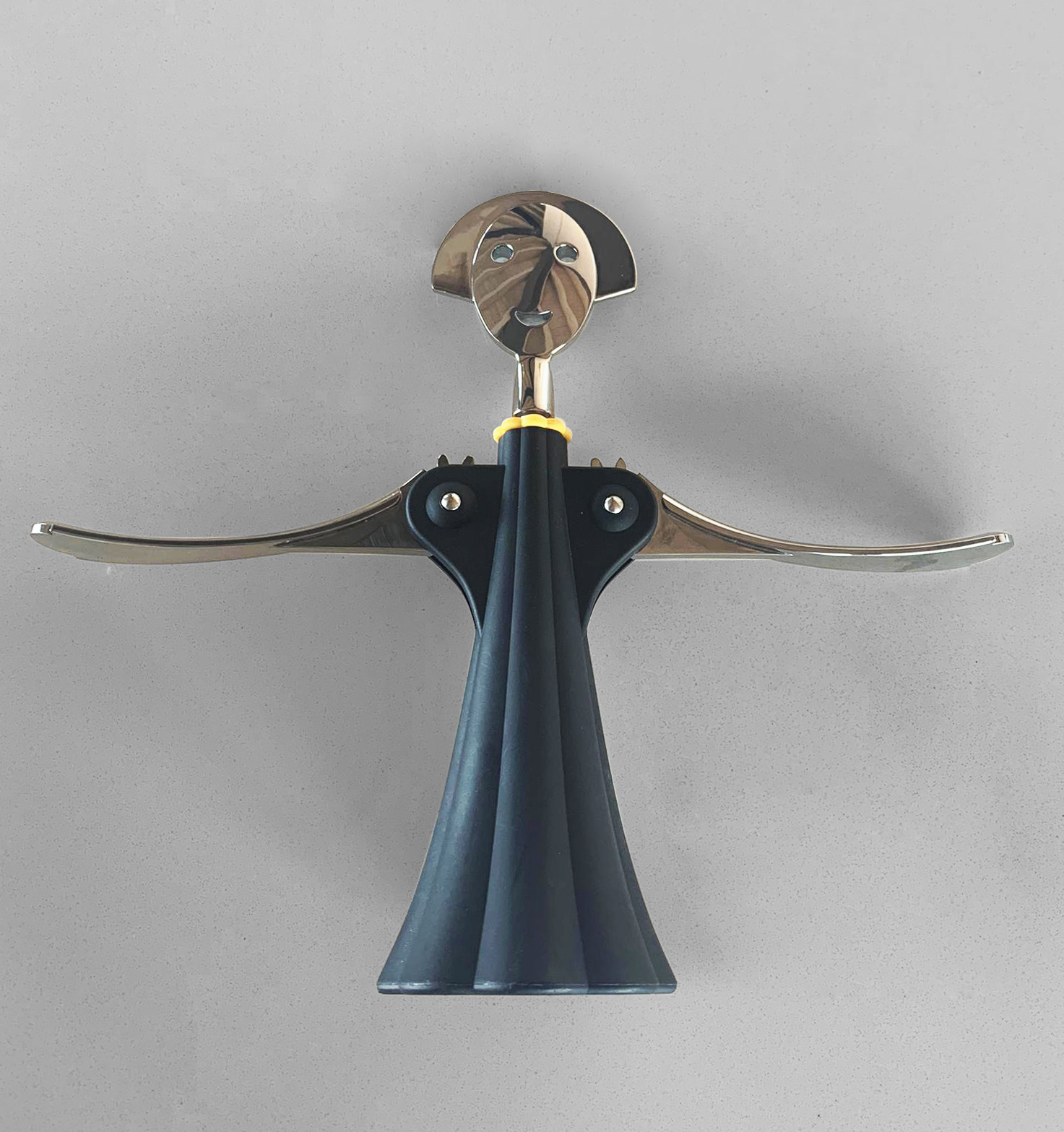
Anna G corkscrew, 1994

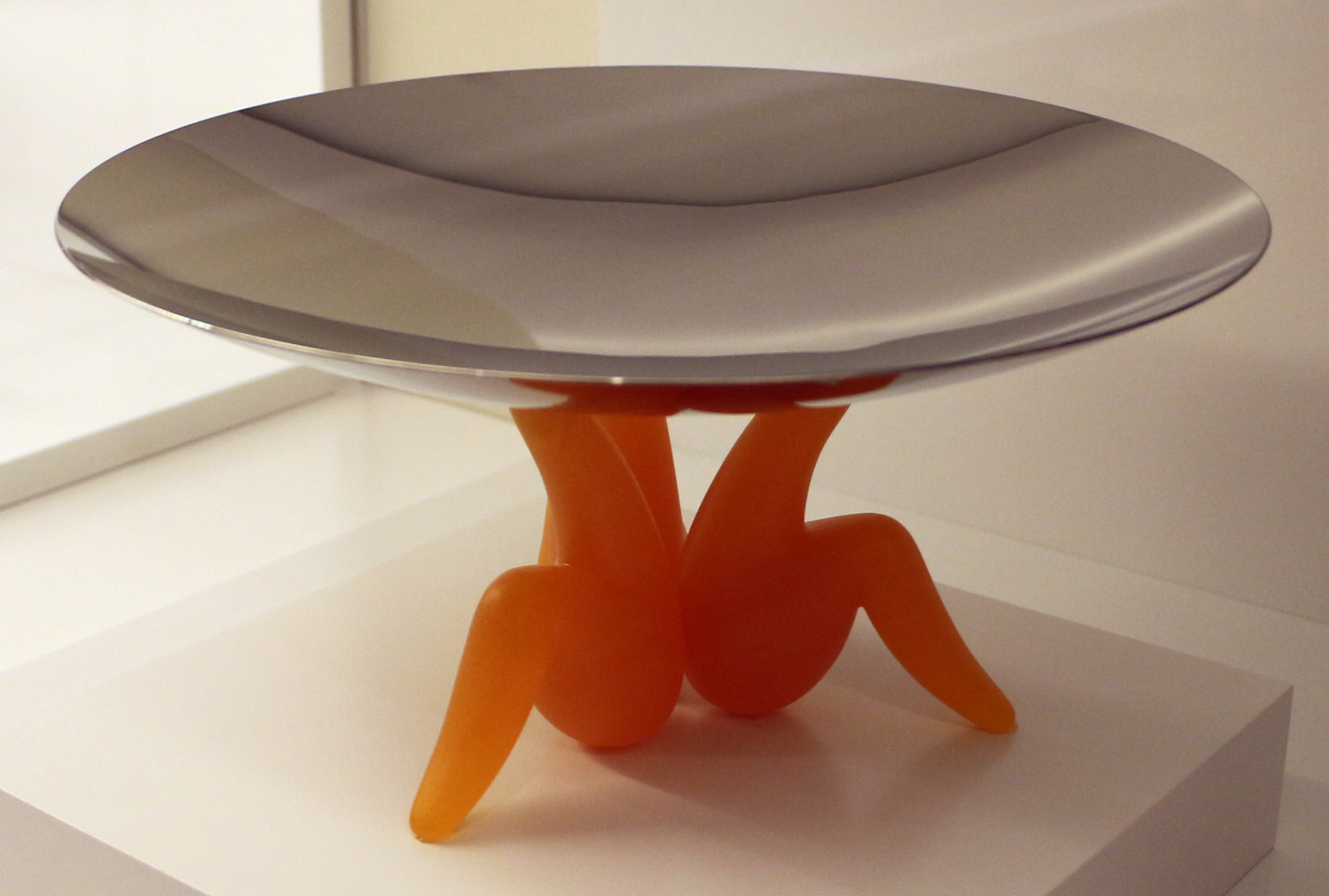
Centrepiece designed by Philippe Starck, 1996

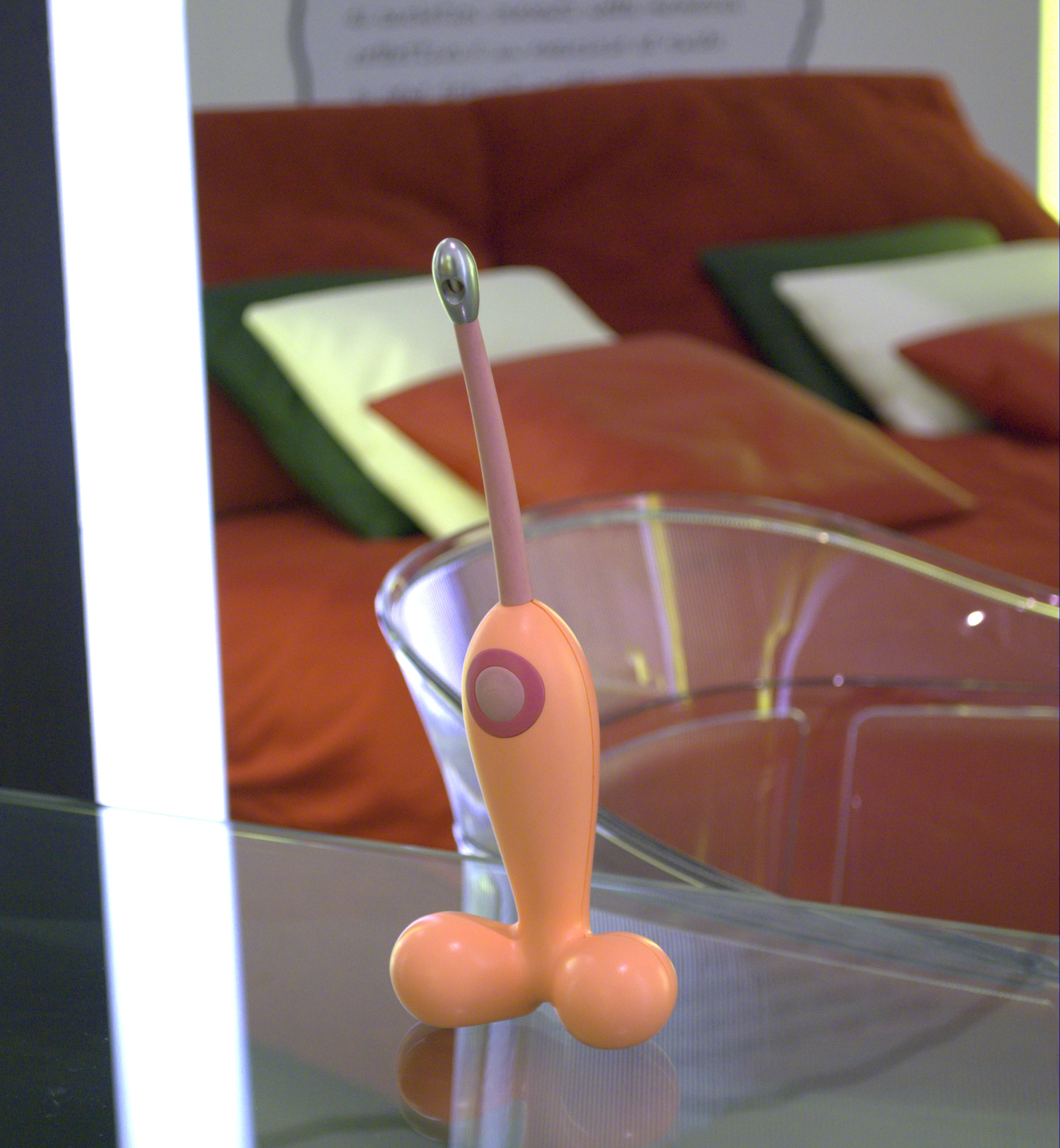
Firebird gas lighter by Guido Venturini

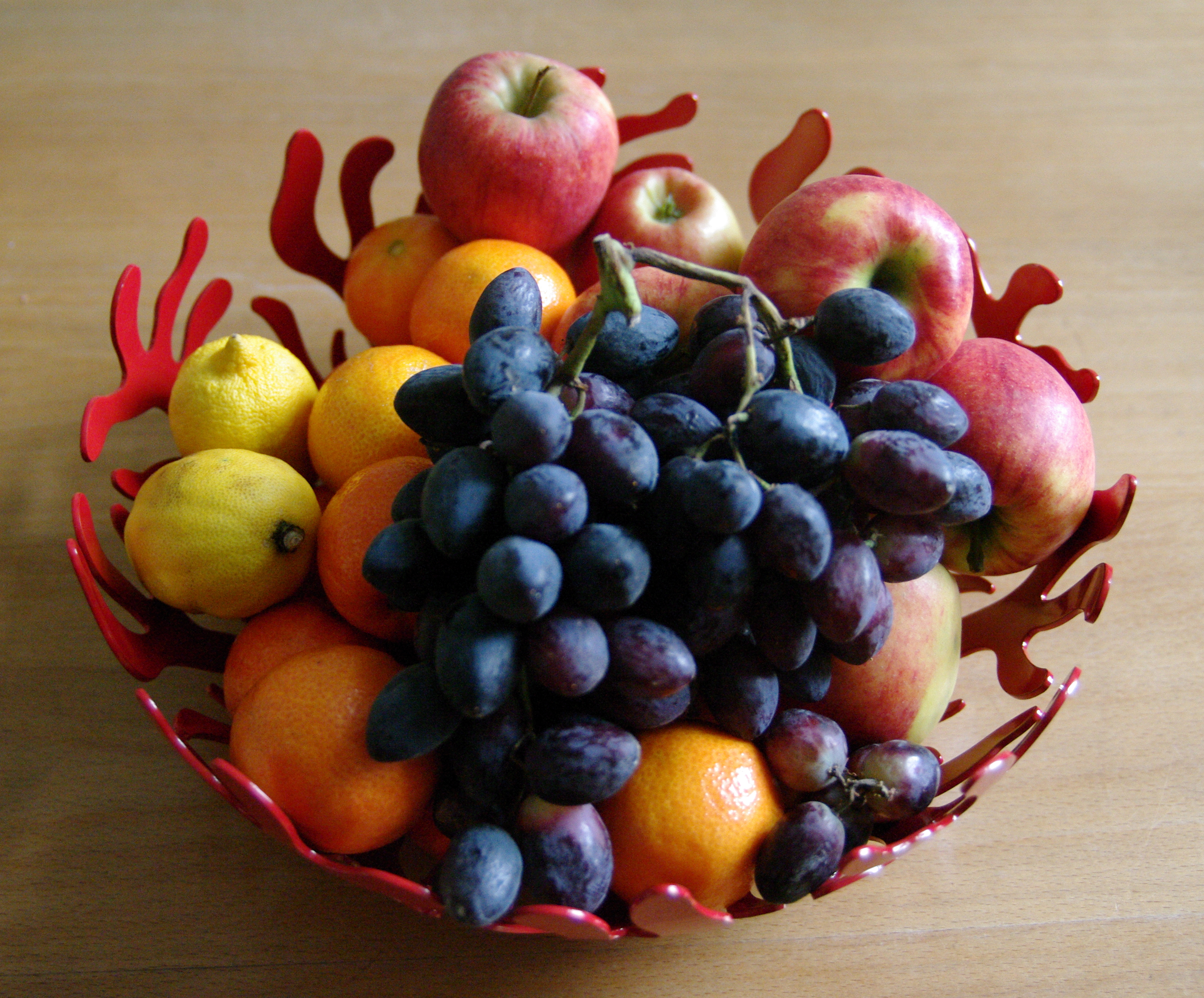
Alessi fruit basket

== Critical reception ==
Although Alessi is credited with introducing many iconic design objects, critics have also complained about items designed for everyday household use which do not perform their basic functions well.

== Ownership and corporate form ==
In August 2019, Oakley Capital (through Iconic Holdco UK) acquired a 40% stake alongside the founding family, as part of a reorganisation and development plan. In 2020 the company amended its statutes to become a società benefit (benefit corporation), integrating public-benefit aims into corporate governance, and later obtained B Corp certification (score 89.1).

== See also ==
- Neapolitan flip coffee pot
- Chiara Luzzana
