= Frame (design magazine) =

Publisher of design, architecture and visual culture books and magazines

FRAME
- Editor-in-chief: Floor Kuitert (2024–present); Robert Thiemann (1997–2023)
- Categories: Interior design, Architecture
- Frequency: Several times per year (print)
- Publisher: Mira Huussen
- Founder: Robert Thiemann and Peter Huiberts
- Founded: 1997
- Company: Frame Publishers
- Country: Netherlands
- Based in: Amsterdam
- Language: English (international distribution; Korean edition previously available)
- Website: www.frameweb.com/magazine
- ISSN: 1388-4239

FRAME (stylized in all caps, with the "E" often mirror-reversed on its cover) is an international magazine and publishing platform covering interior design, architecture, and spatial design. It is based in Amsterdam, the Netherlands, and is published by Frame Publishers.

The magazine was founded in 1997 by Robert Thiemann and Peter Huiberts. FRAME began as a print magazine, and has also expanded into book publishing, awards, events, and digital publishing.

Thiemann served as editor-in-chief from the magazine's founding until 2023. In 2024, Floor Kuitert became editor-in-chief and Mira Huussen continued as sole director.

== History ==
FRAME was launched in December 1997 in Amsterdam by Thiemann and Huiberts, who previously worked together at a Dutch-language interior design magazine before founding Frame Publishers. In a 25th-anniversary interview with Salone del Mobile, Thiemann said the magazine was created to address the absence of an international business-to-business print publication devoted to interiors and spatial design.

The magazine's title has been linked to two meanings by Thiemann: the physical frame of interior space, formed by walls, floor and ceiling, and the editorial act of framing a view of the world.

In a 2014 talk, Thiemann explained the first issue covered flagship store projects for brands including Nike, Diesel and Swatch. He described the magazine's later retail coverage as moving through architect-designed stores, artist collaborations, pop-up retail, heritage aesthetics and sensory environments.

By the 2010s, FRAME had added books, events, awards, online publishing and retail experiments. In 2024, Fast Company reported that Thiemann had led FRAME for 26 years before leaving the magazine to launch the spatial-design consultancy Betterness.

== Content and editorial approach ==
The magazine publishes project reports, interviews, essays, material and product features, and analysis of developments in the built environment.

FRAME has described its editorial development as a shift from interior-design inspiration toward "design intelligence", with themed issues addressing broader questions in spatial design, including sustainability, heritage, luxury, technology and changing patterns of work, retail, hospitality and living..

== Frame Publishers ==
Frame Publishers publishes magazines, books and digital media in the fields of design, architecture, interiors, art, photography and visual culture.

Publications associated with the company have included FRAME, Mark, Elephant, and books on interiors, retail design, materials, residential design, individual designers and studios, and contemporary architecture and design culture.

Examples of its book titles include Powershop 6: Retail Design Now, The Futureproof Home: Design for Conscious Living, Learning from China: A New Era of Retail Design and Jo Nagasaka/Schemata Architects.

== Projects and initiatives ==
=== Frame Store ===
In 2014, Frame Publishers opened temporary retail spaces in Amsterdam designed by i29. One project, developed with Foam Fotografiemuseum Amsterdam, occupied the historic Felix Meritis building and included retail spaces, events, exhibitions and mirrored interiors.

Later that year, FRAME opened a temporary store at Herengracht 178 in Amsterdam. The project was also designed by i29 Interior Architects and translated the magazine's graphic identity into a retail installation. Fast Company described the shop as a "walk-in optical illusion," noting that its interior appeared to invert when seen from different positions. ArchDaily also published the project as a retail interior by i29 in Amsterdam.

=== Ninety Minutes of Frame ===
Ninety Minutes of Frame was a live event format by Frame Publishers. The first edition, "Fashion Rules", was held in December 2013 at Pakhuis de Zwijger in Amsterdam and was described by Mediamatic as a live version of the magazine with lectures and debates. Its programme included speakers from G-Star RAW, AMO, product design and fashion-related spatial practice. In 2014, Adformatie reported that the format formed part of the programme around the Dutch Design Awards finalists' exhibition during Dutch Design Week in Eindhoven.

=== FRAME Awards ===
Frame Publishers organizes the FRAME Awards, an international awards programme for spatial and product design. The awards developed from the earlier Great Indoors Award, which was devoted to interior design.

The first FRAME Awards winners were announced in 2018.

The inaugural awards as covered over 30 interior-design categories, including retail, hospitality, materials and experimental interiors. Bustler reported that the first edition recognized 28 winners from almost 900 submissions.

=== Digital presence on Frameweb.com ===
Frame Publishers introduced a digital membership model in the early 2020s. In 2023, the publisher announced that Frameweb would become a membership-based platform, describing the move as part of a shift toward digital content and professional resources.

== Related publications ==
=== Mark ===
In 2005, Frame Publishers launched Mark (subtitled Another Architecture), a sister publication devoted to contemporary architecture. A 2010 interview with Designboom described Mark as a spin-off of FRAME. The magazine extended Frame Publishers' editorial coverage from interiors into architecture.

ArchDaily regularly covered issues of Mark between 2008 and 2013, describing it as a publication focused on architectural projects, interviews, graphic presentation, and project dossiers. Its coverage noted recurring sections such as Notice Board, Short Section, Viewpoint, Long Section and Service Area, indicating a mixture of unbuilt projects, short building reports, interviews, project features and technical material.

Architects and practices mentioned in ArchDaily's issue notices included Zaha Hadid, Morphosis, Farshid Moussavi, Wang Shu, Tom Kundig, Kazuyo Sejima, Toyo Ito, Sou Fujimoto, Steven Holl, Amanda Levete, Wiel Arets, Lacaton & Vassal, Riken Yamamoto, Yung Ho Chang, OMA, BIG, UNStudio, MAD Architects, Atelier Bow-Wow and SANAA.

The magazine's issue themes included "House Rules" in issue 16, "Amsterdam, Back on the Map" in issue 38, Poland's architecture scene in issue 42, new museum projects in the United States in issue 43, architectural freedom in Indonesia in issue 44 and Pioneertown in issue 46. The magazine was noted for its visual format, covers, graphic design and project selection in several issue notices.

=== Elephant ===
Frame Publishers also published Elephant, a contemporary art and visual culture magazine edited by Marc Valli. The magazine was launched in 2009 and issued quarterly. Design Week reported on a 2014 redesign of Elephant, describing changes to its typography, layout and colour palette.

The magazine was later acquired by Colart. In 2022, The Art Newspaper reported that Colart, which had purchased Elephant in May 2017, would cease funding the magazine, leading to its planned closure unless a new owner was found.

The publication later continued online at Elephant.art, where it covers artist-led contemporary art reporting. As of 2026, the site listed artist Tschabalala Self as editor-in-chief.

== Anniversary issue ==
In 2022, FRAME marked its 25th anniversary with issue 149, titled Spaces That Matter. The anniversary was accompanied by interviews on the magazine's development from print publication into a spatial-design platform.

== Bibliographic information ==
ISSN Portal records Frame under ISSN 1388-4239, with the key title Frame (Amsterdam) and the Netherlands as the country of publication. WorldCat lists the magazine as an English-language journal/magazine published in Amsterdam from 1997 onward.
