= The Best Dutch Book Designs =

- Awarded for: Graphic industry in the Netherlands
- Sponsored by: Best Dutch Book Designs Foundation, with funding from Pictoright, Igepa Nederland, L. van Heek Textiles, and others (2025)
- Venue: Stedelijk Museum Amsterdam
- Country: Netherlands
- First award: 1926
- Website: https://debestverzorgdeboeken.nl/

The Best Dutch Book Designs (Dutch: De Best Verzorgde Boeken) is a yearly Dutch book design contest given by the foundation of the same name. The competition is the oldest of its kind in Europe, with its first iteration running in 1926.

== History ==
The Best Dutch Book Designs started in 1926 as an initiative of the Nederlandsch Verbond van Boekenvrienden (1925–1942) and was later taken over by the Collectieve Propaganda van het Nederlandse Boek (CPNB). Its first catalogue of the fifty best Dutch books made in the Netherlands was published in 1926 and repeated over the next four years. In part because of the Great Depression in the Netherlands and the Second World War, The Best Dutch Book Designs was paused after 1932, and only taken up again in 1948. In 1932, the prize was also presented alongside an exhibition for the first time, which has continued yearly at the Stedelijk Museum in Amsterdam since 1954.

During this second period, which lasted until the early 1970s, the award received both much praise and critique. While jury reports from 1953 reveal the fast pace in new design developments on the Dutch market, later iterations showed a substantial dissatisfaction among jury members, lowering the number of books presented to just about forty in 1968. In the 1970s the competition lost its funding and jury due to restructuring at CPNB. After securing funding again in 1986 and becoming its own foundation in 1998, The Best Dutch Book Designs competition and exhibition have been ongoing, nominating hundreds of books each year, of which about thirty end up winning.

== Contest criteria and categories ==
For candidates to enter The Best Dutch Book Designs, and to have a chance of being exhibited as one of the winning books, the foundation and jury have established a framework of criteria. While a book entered into the contest does not necessarily have to be written using the Dutch language, the jury requires certain aspects of the book design to be from the Netherlands. Participating books must fit at least two of the following three criteria:

1. Published by a publisher in the Netherlands
2. Designed by a Dutch Designer or a designer based in the Netherlands
3. Printed, lithographed and/or bound by a Dutch graphic design company

The Best Dutch Book Designs also categorises books into genres. The genre categories are:

- Prose, poetry or graphic novels
- Informative books (e.g. cookbooks, history books or dissertations)
- Art, photography and architecture books
- Children's and youth literature
- Other

== Jury and awards ==
Books for The Best Dutch Book Design are chosen by two different jurys. First, the student jury, made up of student members from Dutch top academies, selects their candidate books. This initial selection also becomes part of the final exhibition at the Stedelijk Museum. After the student selection is complete, the professional jury, consisting of experts in art, culture, design and print publication, selects the Dutch book designs of the past year. The professional jury looks at a combination of design, printing and binding techniques when judging the books. They also consider the commissioning of each book, while keeping in mind the budget and target audience of each piece. While this professional jury ultimately decides the winners of The Best Dutch Book Design contest, the student jury's selection often considerably overlaps with this final selection.

The foundation also introduced a new award to the competition in 2024. "De Kapitaal" is given to a person, organisation or initiative, awarding them for a highly distinguished contribution to Dutch book care. The prize, in form of a sculpture, is given out during the exhibition of The Best Dutch Book Design in the Stedelijk Museum in Amsterdam.

== Winners (selection) ==
According to the award's website, which lists the awarded books since 2006, the following selection of designers have frequently received an award for a book design since 2006: Irma Boom, Hans Gremmen, Michaël Snitker, Haller Brun, Jeremy Jansen, Mevis & Van Deursen / Linda van Deursen, Joost Grootens.

The first winner of "De Kapitaal", in 2024, was Dutch graphic designer Joost Grootens.
