= Eindhoven =

City and municipality in North Brabant, Netherlands

- City and municipality
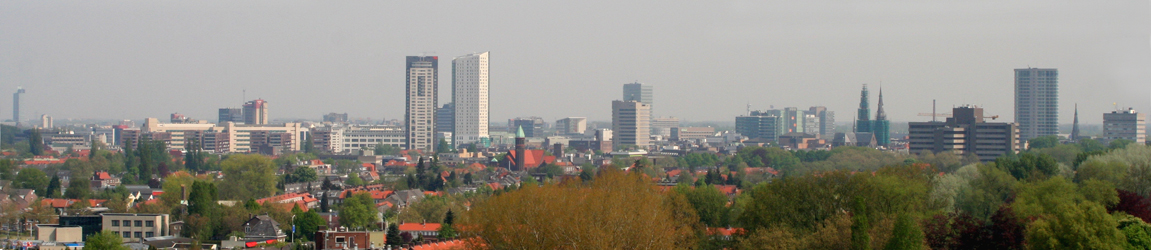
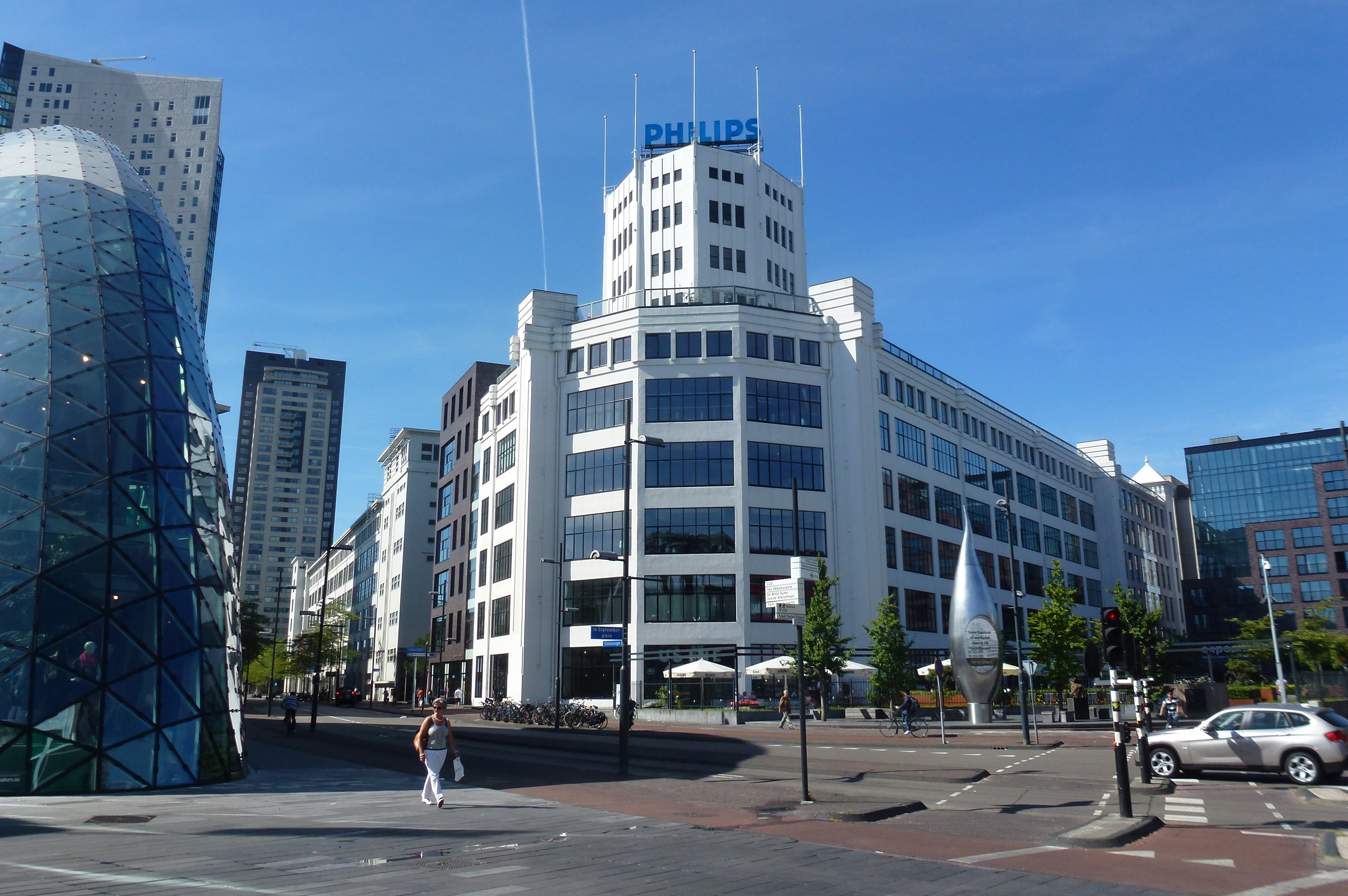
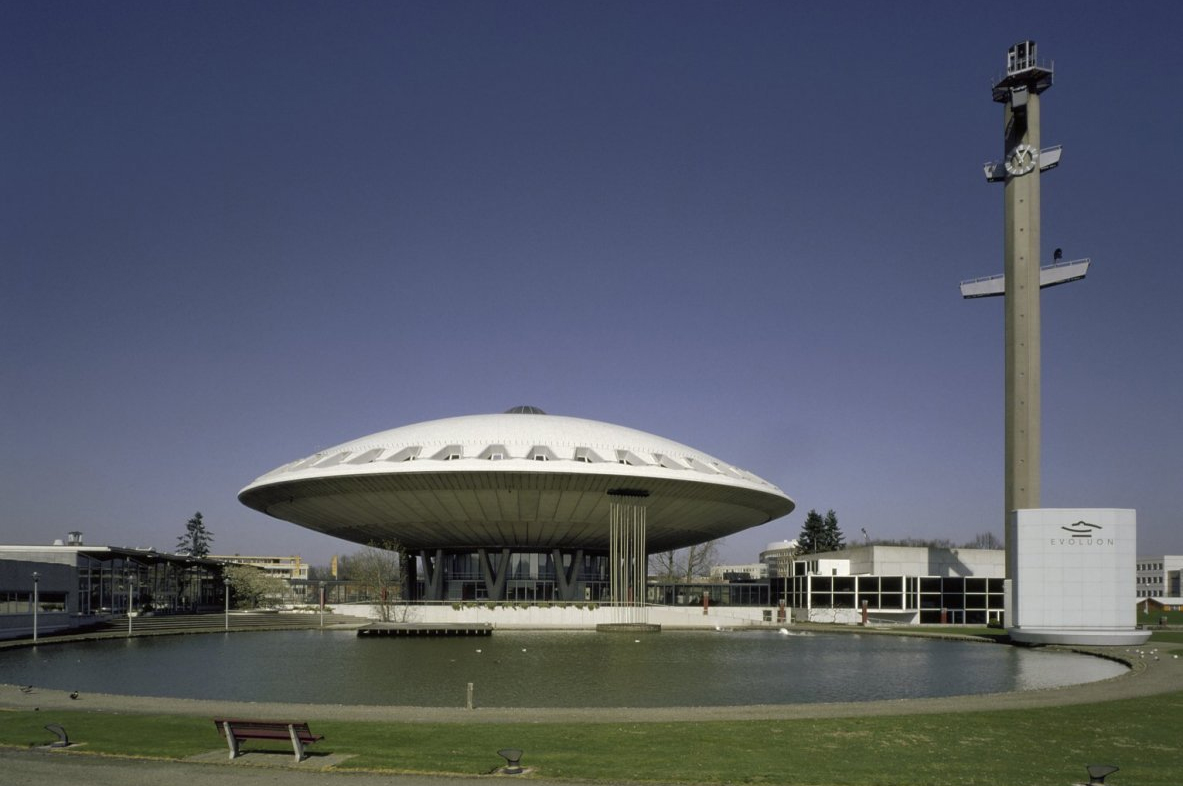
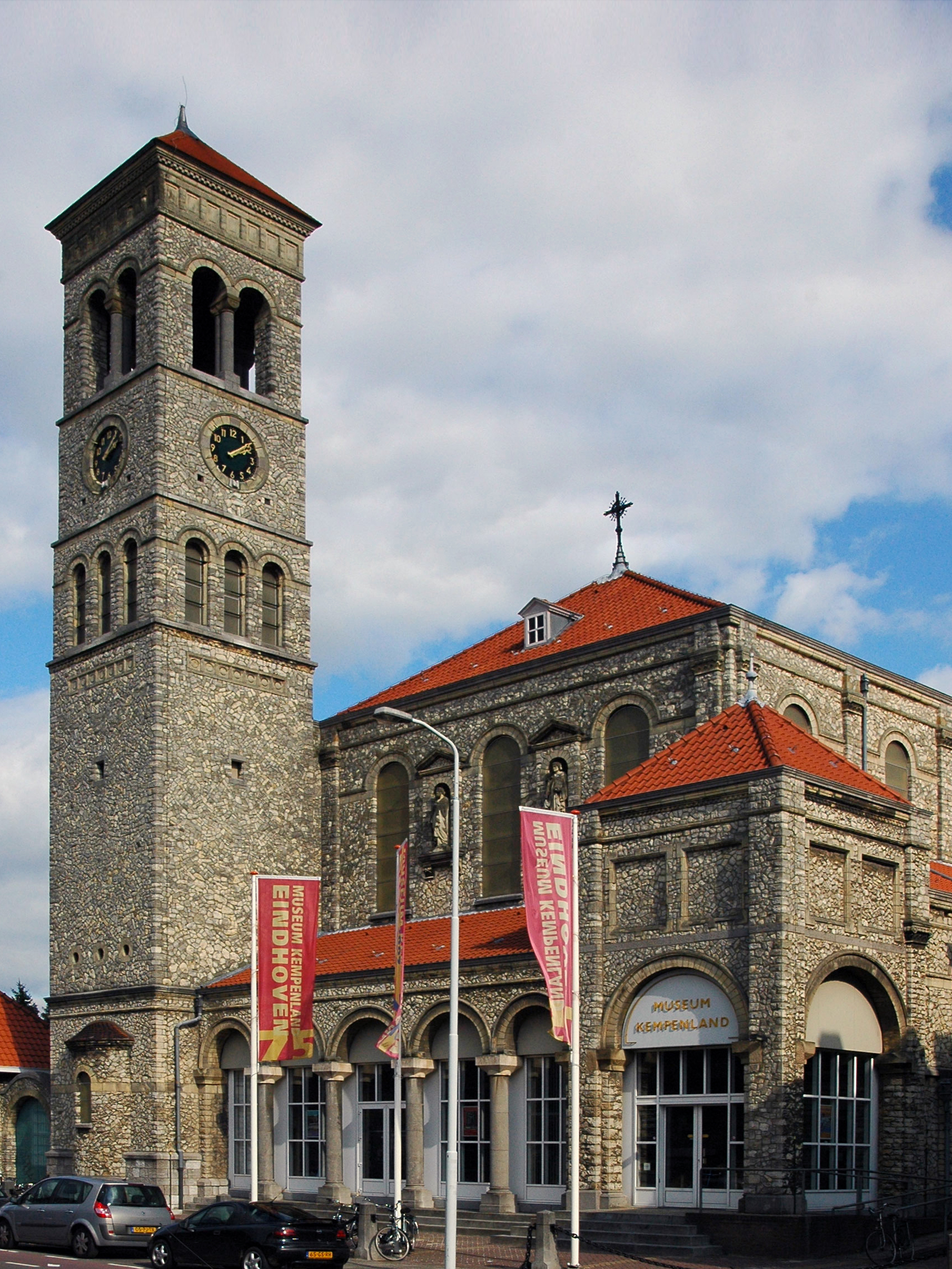
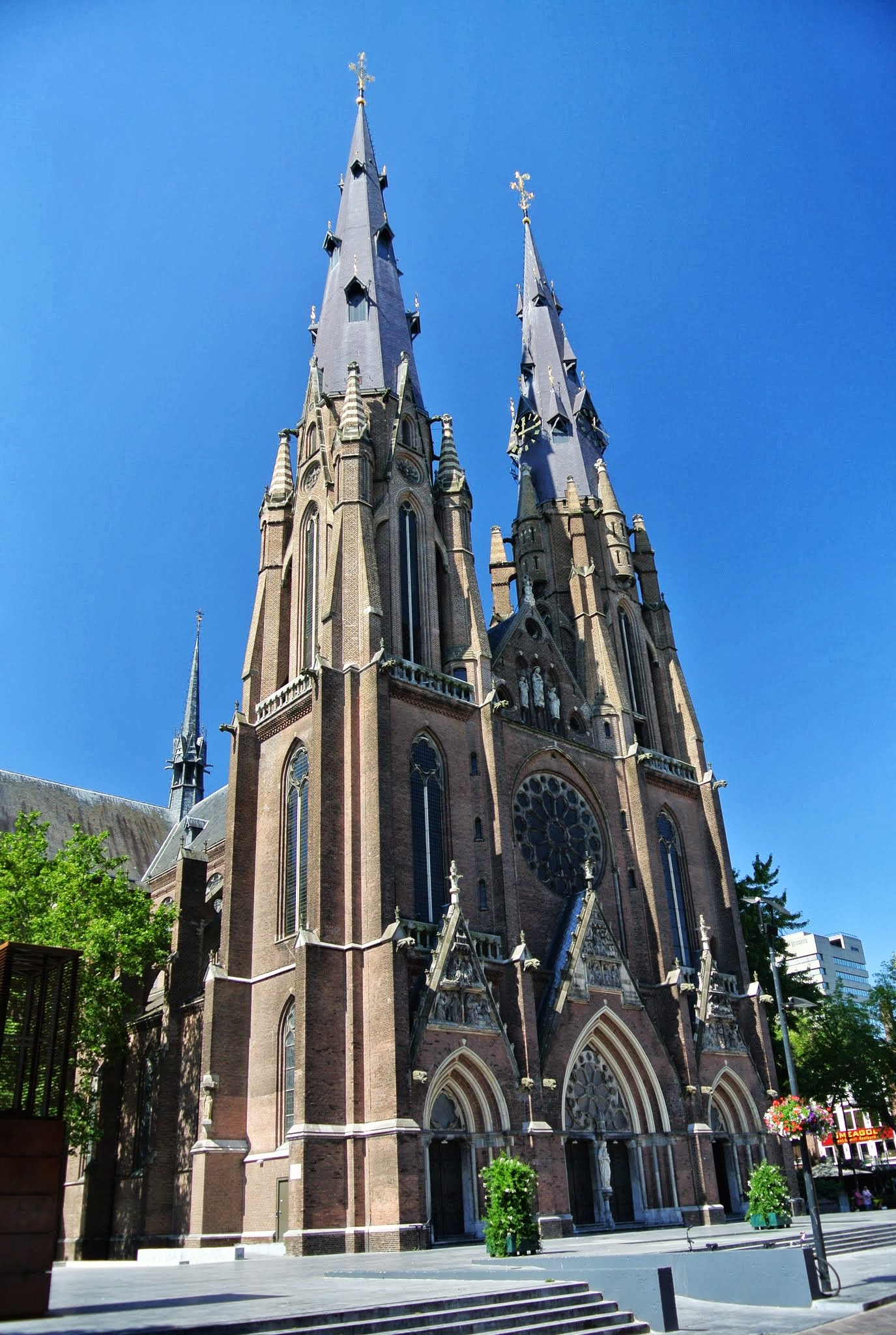
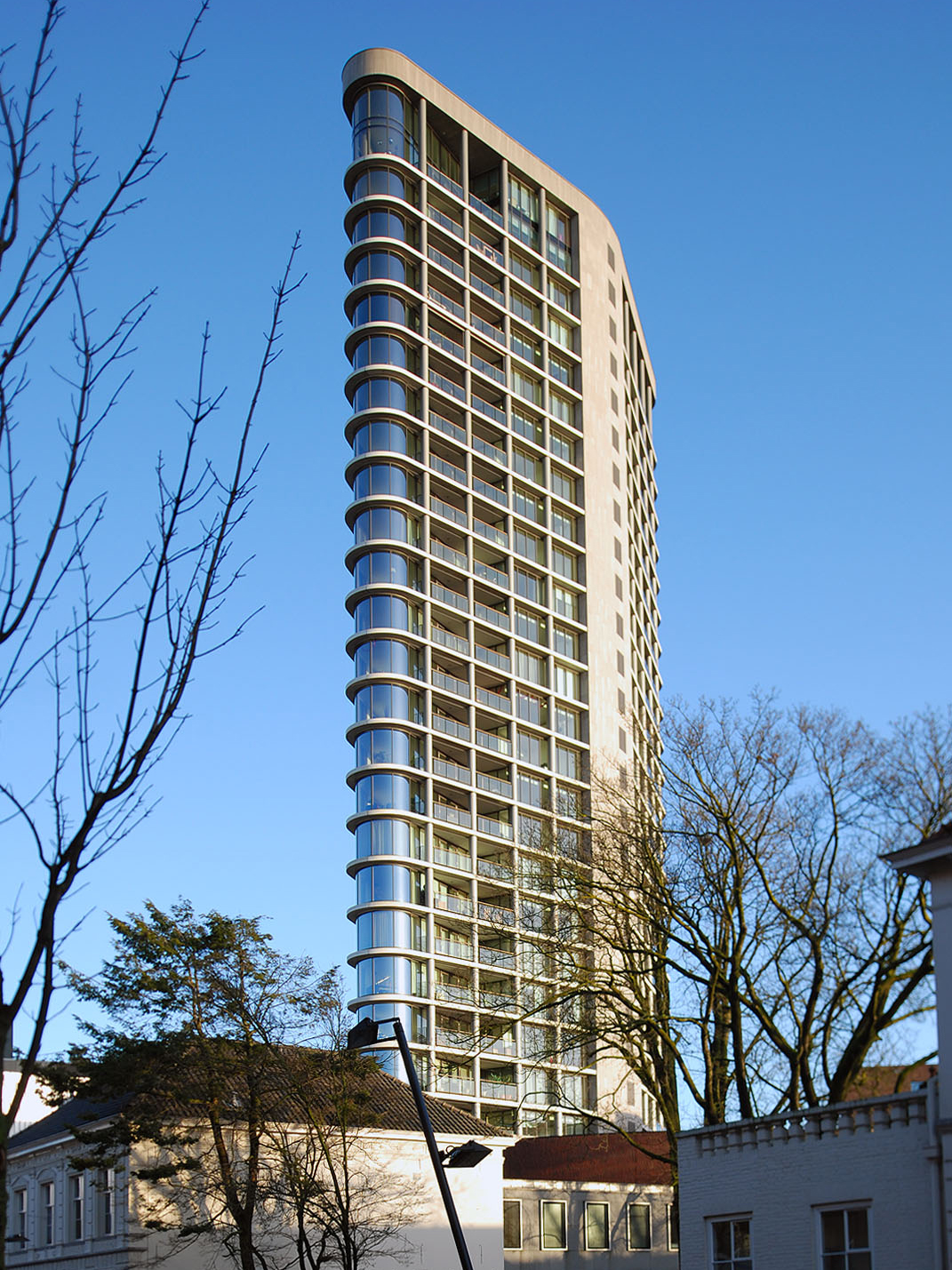
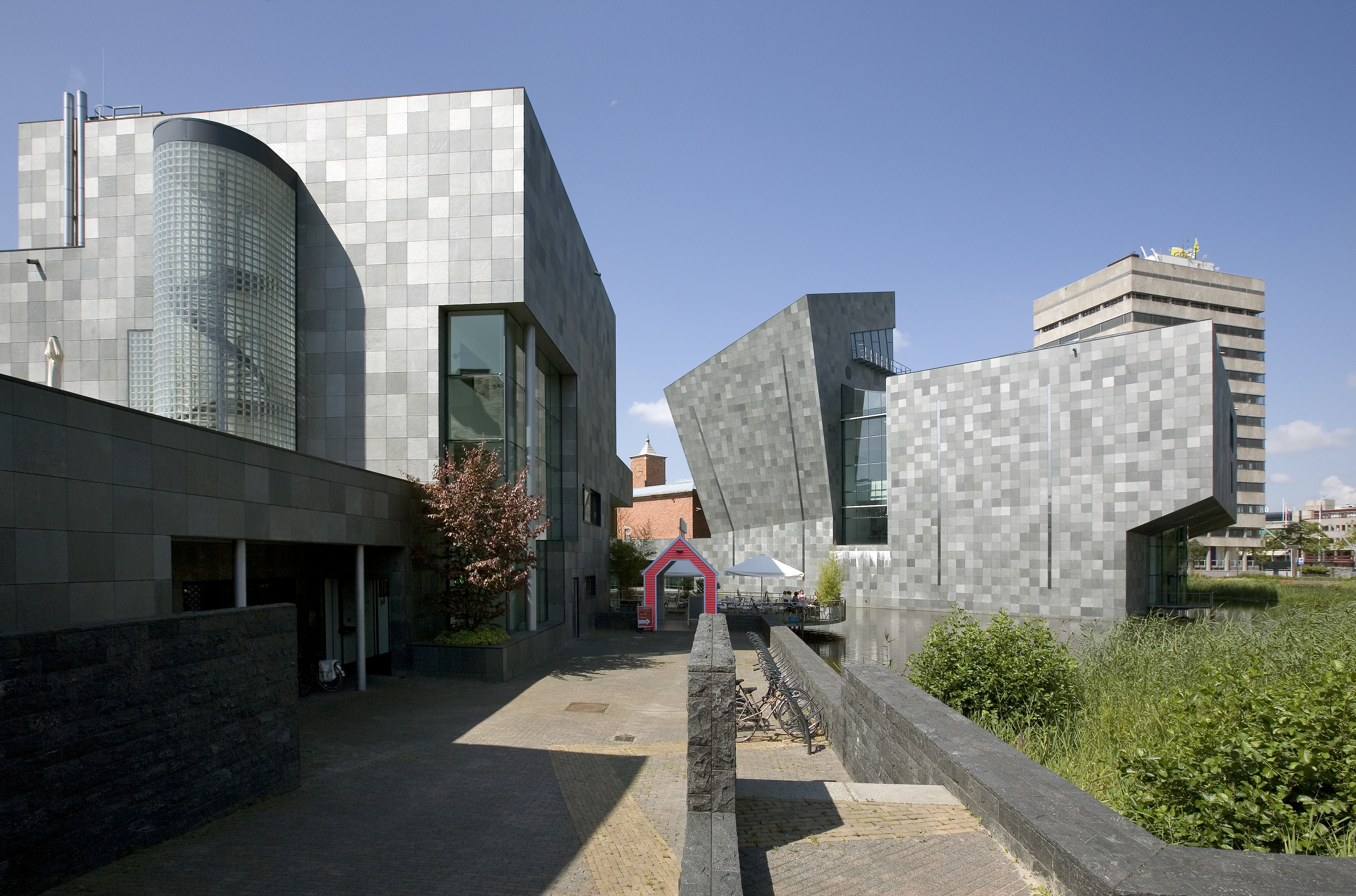
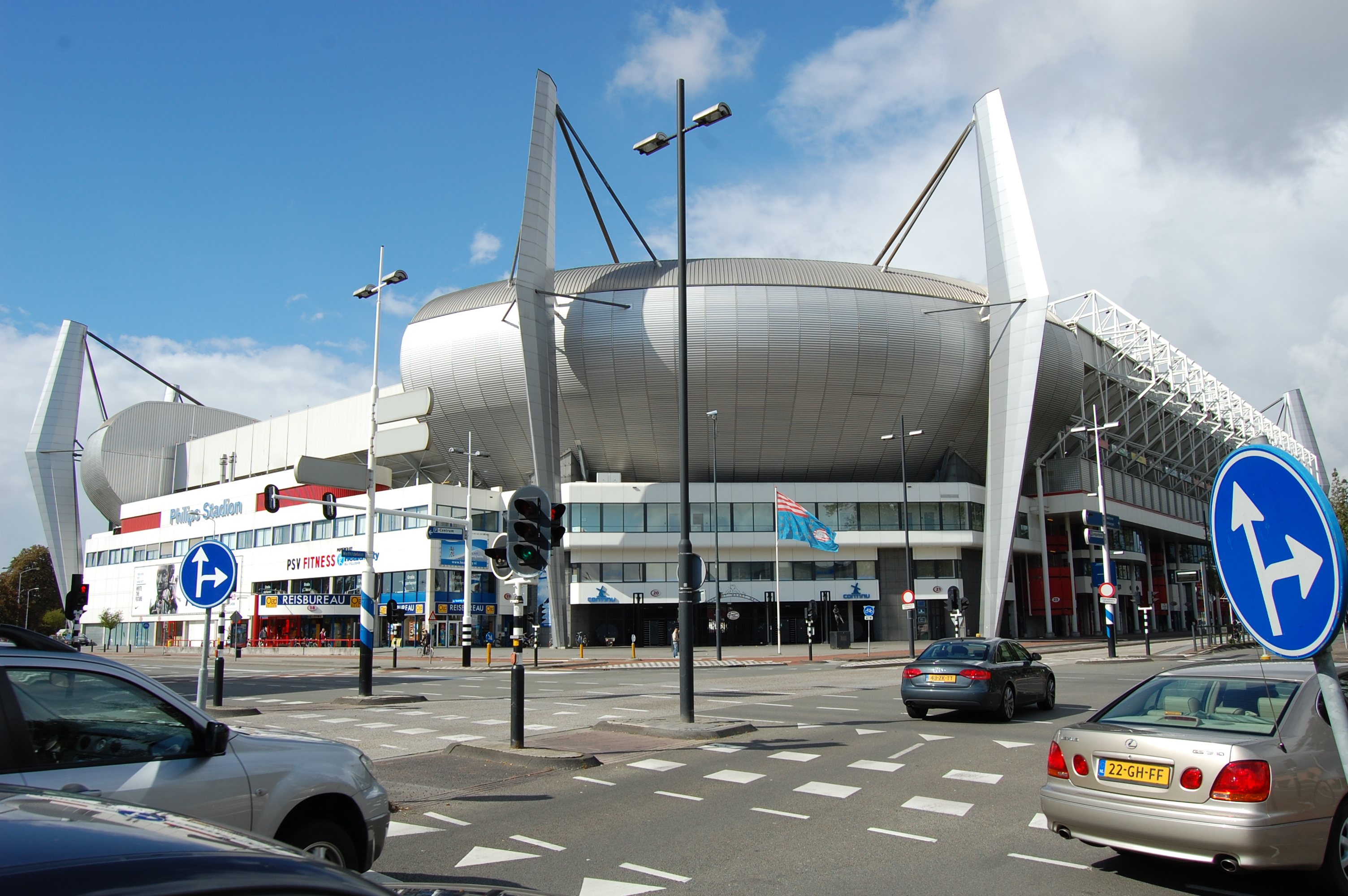
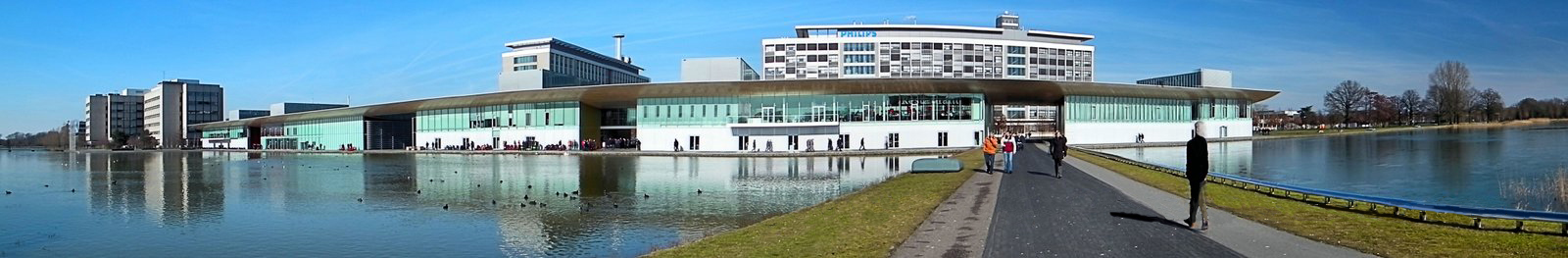
- Skyline of Eindhoven Light Tower Evoluon conference centre St. Anthony Church St. Catherine Church Vesteda Tower Van Abbe Museum Philips Stadium of PSV Eindhoven High Tech Campus Eindhoven

- Flag Coat of arms Brandmark
- Interactive map of Eindhoven
- Location within the Netherlands Location within Europe
- Coordinates: 51°26′N 5°29′E
- Country: Netherlands
- Province: North Brabant

Government
  - Body: Municipal council
  - Mayor: Jeroen Dijsselbloem (PvdA)

Area
  - Municipality: 88.92 km^{2} (34.33 sq mi)
  - Land: 87.66 km^{2} (33.85 sq mi)
  - Water: 1.26 km^{2} (0.49 sq mi)
- Elevation: 17 m (56 ft)

Population (Municipality, January 2026; Urban and Metro, May 2014; Metro region and CMSA, August 2015)
  - Municipality: 249,783
  - Density: 2,849/km^{2} (7,380/sq mi)
  - Urban: 337,487
  - Metro: 780,611
  - CMSA: 1,944,588
- Demonym(s): Eindhovenaar, Eindhoevenaar
- Time zone: UTC+1 (CET)
  - Summer (DST): UTC+2 (CEST)
- Postcodes: 5600–5658
- Area code: 040
- Website: www.eindhoven.nl

Eindhoven (/ˈaɪnthoʊvən/ EYENT-hoh-vən;; Dutch: [ˈɛintˌɦoːvə(n)]) is a city and municipality in the Netherlands. It is the largest city in the southern province of North Brabant, and is located in the Dutch part of the Campine natural region. With a population of 249,054 (1 January 2025) on a territory of 88.92 km^{2}, it is the fifth-largest city of the Netherlands and the largest outside the Randstad conurbation.

Eindhoven was originally located at the confluence of the Dommel and the Gender. A municipality since the 13th century, Eindhoven witnessed rapid growth starting in the 1900s by textile and tobacco industries. Two well-known companies, DAF Trucks and Philips, were founded in the city; Philips would go on to become a major multinational conglomerate while based in Eindhoven. Apart from Philips, Eindhoven also contains the globally famous Design Academy Eindhoven.

Neighbouring cities and towns include Son en Breugel, Nuenen, Geldrop-Mierlo, Helmond, Heeze-Leende, Waalre, Veldhoven, Eersel, Oirschot and Best. The agglomeration has a population of 337,487. The metropolitan area consists of 780,611 inhabitants. The city region has a population of 753,426. The Brabantse Stedenrij combined metropolitan area has about two million inhabitants.

== Etymology ==
The name may derive from the contraction of the regional words eind (meaning "last" or "end") and hove (or hoeve, a section of some 14 hectares of land). Toponymically, eind occurs commonly as a prefix and postfix in local place- and street names. A "hove" comprised a parcel of land which a local lord might lease to private persons (such as farmers). Given that a string of such parcels existed around Woensel, the name Eindhoven may have originated with the meaning literally "last hoves on the land of Woensel" in Dutch language.

Another explanation is that the Gender, one of the streams that flowed near Eindhoven, was once known as "Einde" or "Ende" and the name therefore could have come from "hove," with a similar meaning as above, on the stream "Einde." By this reasoning the city's name would mean something like "farmstead on the river Einde."

== History ==
=== 13th–15th centuries ===
The written history of Eindhoven started in 1232, when Duke Hendrik I of Brabant granted city rights to Eindhoven, then a small town right on the confluence of the Dommel and Gender streams. At the time of granting of its charter, Eindhoven had approximately 170 houses enclosed by a rampart. Just outside the city walls stood a small castle. The city was also granted the right to organize a weekly market and the farmers in nearby villages were obliged to come to Eindhoven to sell their produce. Another factor in its establishment was its location on the trade route from Holland to Liège.

Around 1388, the city's fortifications were strengthened further. And between 1413 and 1420, a new castle was built within the city walls. In 1486, Eindhoven was plundered and burned by troops from Guelders.

=== 16th–18th centuries ===
Comparison of the map of Eindhoven from c. 1550 with the 2024 map

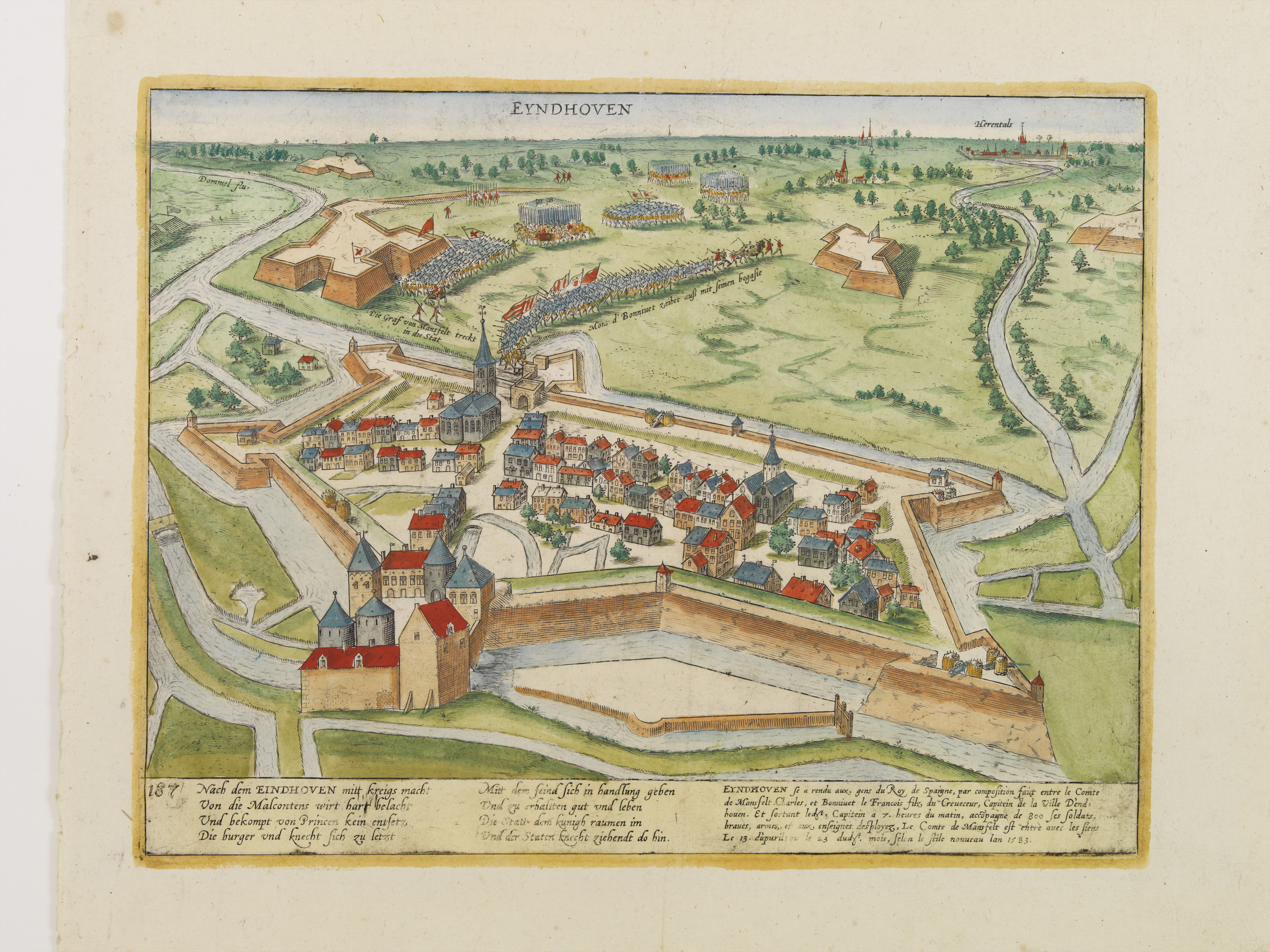
The capture of Eindhoven in 1583, by Frans Hogenberg

The reconstruction of Eindhoven was finished in 1502, with a stronger rampart and a new castle. However, in 1543 it fell again, its defence works having been neglected due to poverty.

A big fire in 1554 destroyed 75% of the houses but by 1560 these had been rebuilt with the help of William I of Orange. During the Dutch Revolt, Eindhoven changed hands between the Dutch and the Spanish several times during which it was burned down by renegade Spanish soldiers, until finally in 1583 it was captured once more by Spanish troops and its city walls were demolished.

Eindhoven did not become part of the Netherlands until 1629. During the French occupation, Eindhoven suffered again with many of its houses destroyed by the invading forces. Eindhoven remained a minor city after that until the start of the Industrial Revolution.

=== 19th century ===
The Industrial Revolution of the 19th century provided a major growth impulse. Canals, roads and railroads were constructed. Eindhoven was connected to the major Zuid-Willemsvaart canal through the Eindhovens Kanaal branch in 1843 and was connected by rail to Tilburg, 's-Hertogenbosch, Venlo and Belgium between 1866 and 1870. Industrial activities initially centred around tobacco and textiles and boomed with the rise of lighting and electronics giant Philips, which was founded as a light bulb manufacturing company in Eindhoven in 1891.

Industrialisation brought population growth to Eindhoven. On the establishment of the Kingdom of the Netherlands in 1815, Eindhoven had 2,310 inhabitants.

=== 20th century ===
By 1920, the population was 47,946; by 1925 it was 63,870 and in 1935 that had ballooned to 103,030. The explosive growth of industry in the region and the subsequent housing needs of workers called for radical changes in administration, as the City of Eindhoven was still confined to its medieval moat city limits. In 1920, the five neighbouring municipalities of Woensel (to the north), Tongelre (northeast and east), Stratum (southeast), Gestel en Blaarthem (southwest) and Strijp (west), which already bore the brunt of the housing needs and related problems, were incorporated into the new Groot-Eindhoven ("Greater Eindhoven") municipality. The prefix "Groot-" was later dropped.

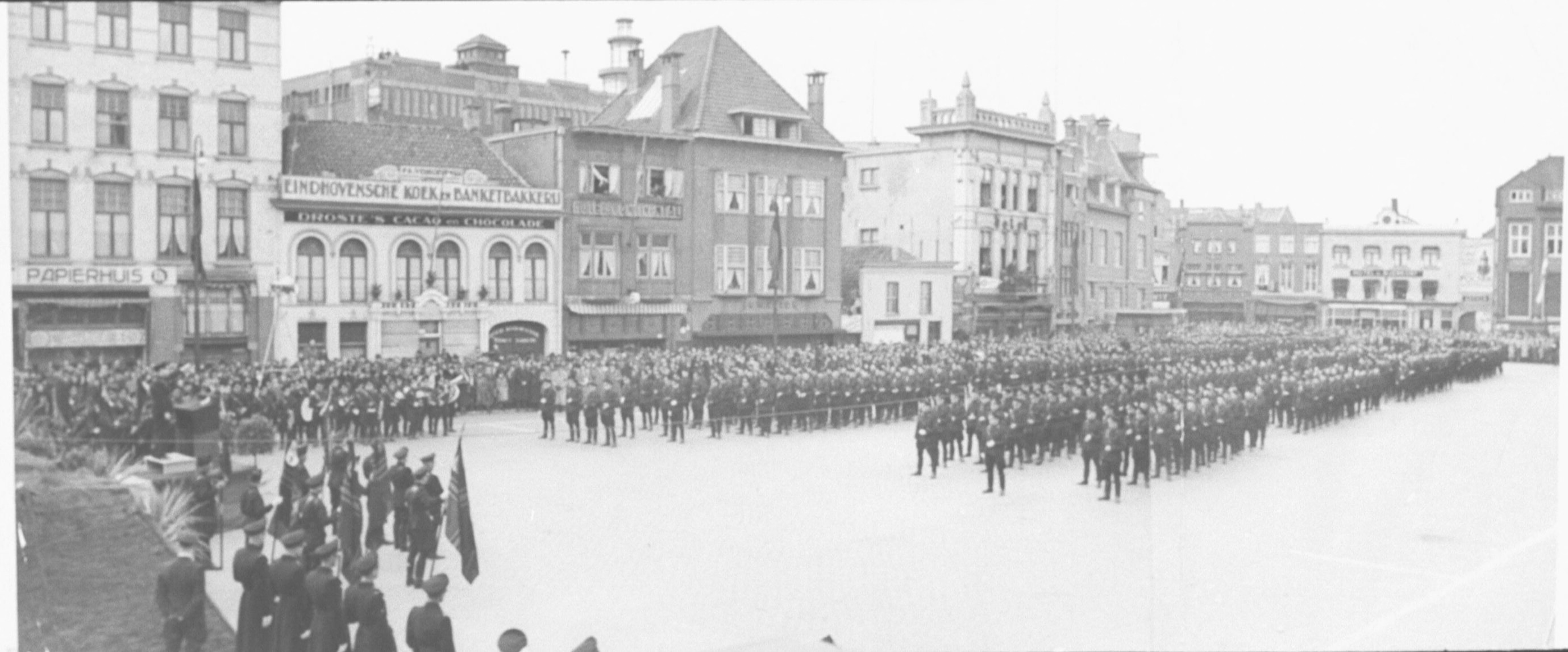
The National Socialist Movement in the Netherlands, Eindhoven in April 1941

After the incorporation of 1920, the five former municipalities became districts of the Municipality of Eindhoven, with Eindhoven-Centrum (the City proper) forming the sixth. Since then, an additional seventh district has been formed by dividing the largest district, that of Woensel, into Woensel-Zuid and Woensel-Noord.

The early 20th century saw additions in technical industry with the advent of car and truck manufacturing company Van Doorne's Aanhangwagenfabriek (Trailer factory) (DAF) which was later renamed to Van Doorne's Automobiel Fabriek and the subsequent shift towards electronics and engineering, with the traditional tobacco and textile industries waning and finally disappearing in the 1970s.

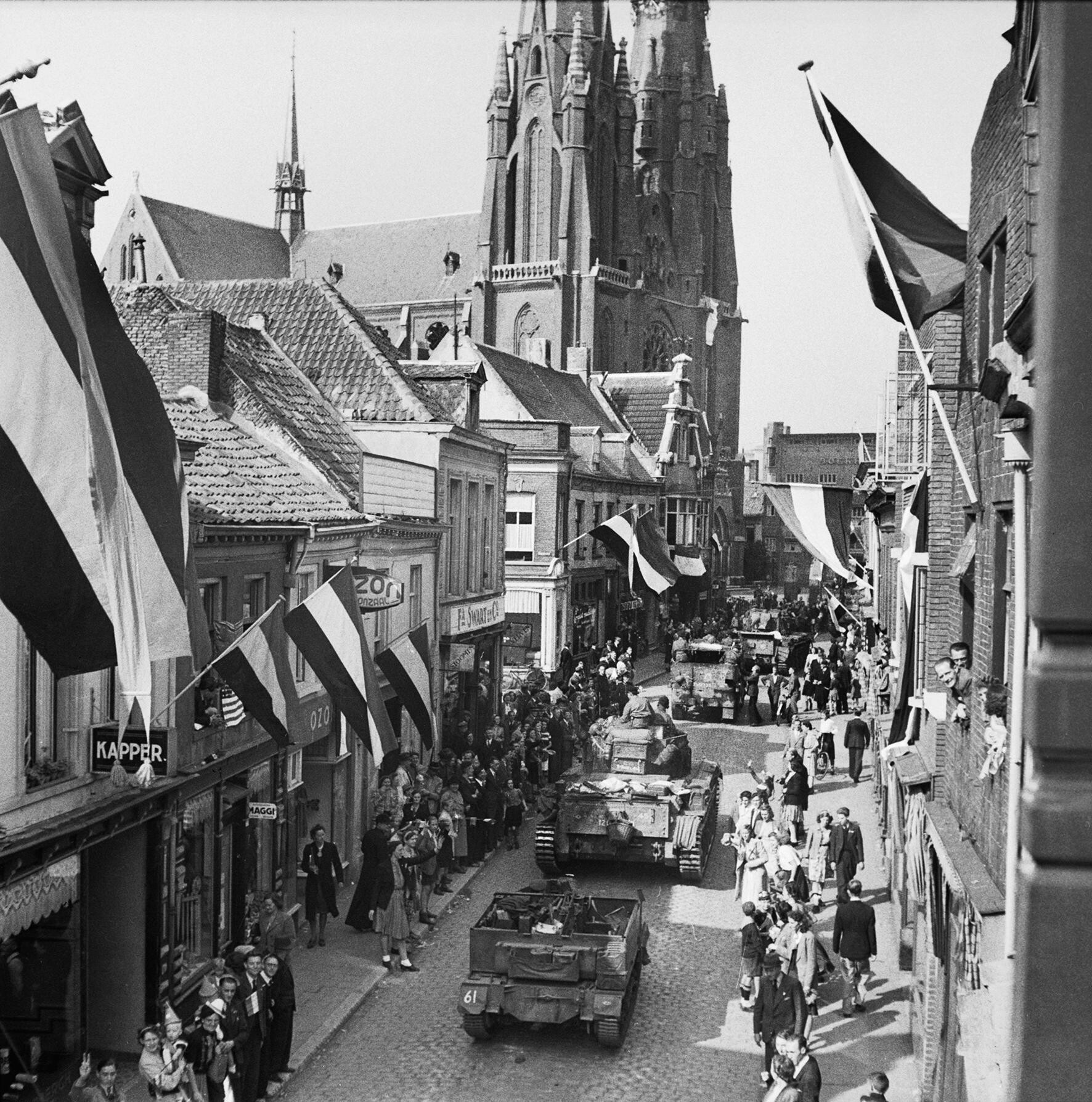
People of Eindhoven (during World War II) watching Allied forces entering the city following its liberation from Axis forces on 19 September 1944.

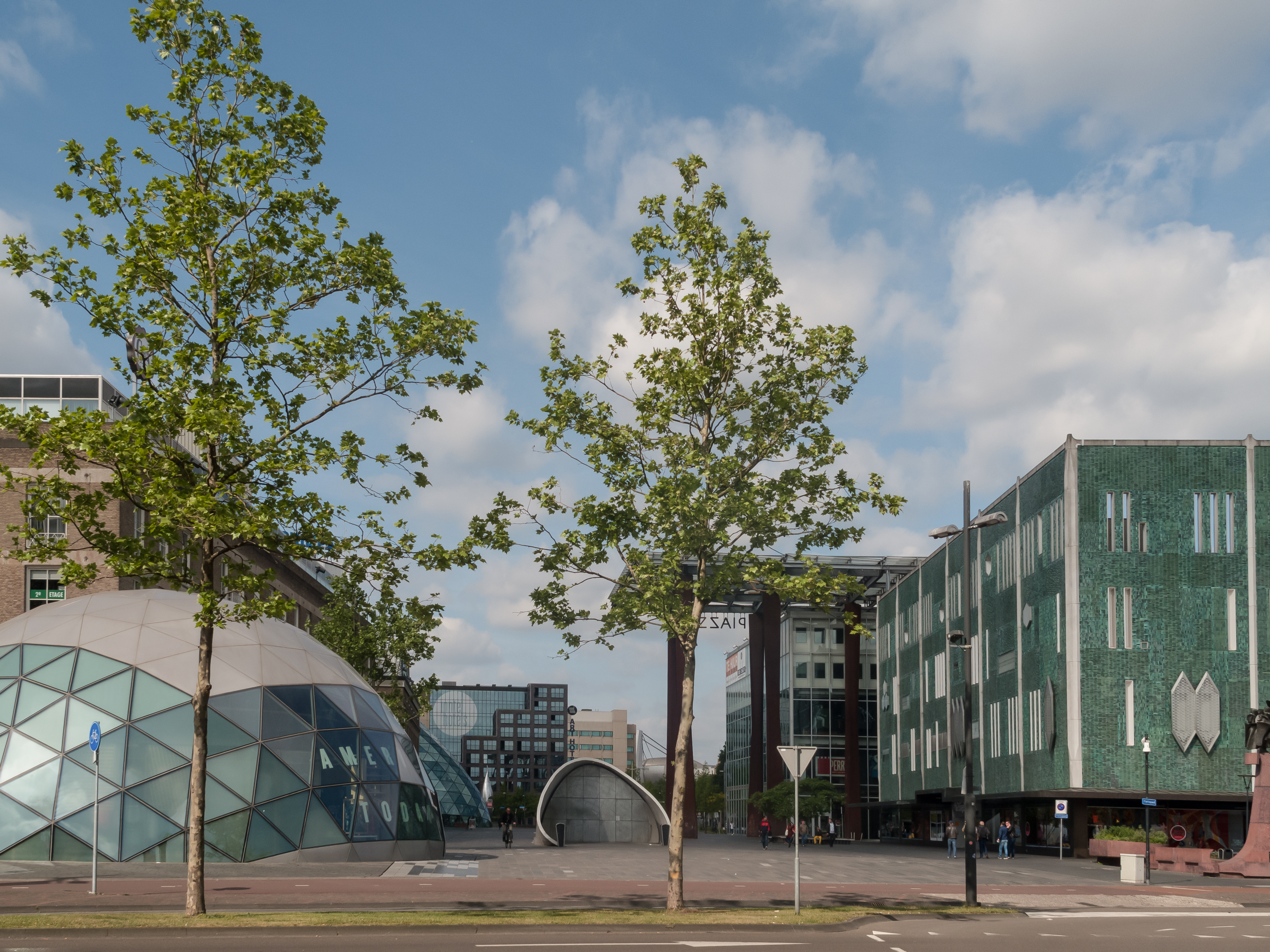
Eindhoven, view to a street: 18 September Square-Vestdijk-Stationsplein

A first air raid in World War II was flown by the RAF on 6 December 1942 targeting the Philips factory downtown, in which 148 civilians died, even though the attack was carried out on a Sunday. Large-scale air raids, including the bombing by the Luftwaffe on 19 September 1944 during Operation Market Garden, destroyed large parts of the city and killed 227 civilians while leaving 800 wounded. The reconstruction that followed left very little historical remains and the postwar reconstruction period saw drastic renovation plans in highrise style, some of which were implemented. At the time, there was little regard for historical heritage. During the 1960s, a new city hall was built and its Neo-gothic predecessor (1867) demolished to make way for a planned arterial road that never materialised.

The 1970s, 1980s, and 1990s saw large-scale housing developments in the districts of Woensel-Zuid and Woensel-Noord, making Eindhoven the fifth-largest city in the Netherlands.

=== 21st century ===
At the start of the 21st century, a whole new housing development called Meerhoven was constructed at the site of the old airport of Welschap, west of Eindhoven. The airport itself, now called Eindhoven Airport, had moved earlier to a new location, paving the way for much-needed new houses. Meerhoven is part of the Strijp district and is partially built on lands annexed from the municipality of Veldhoven. Eindhoven has been named the world's most relaxing city to live in 2026. It ranks first in top ten most relaxing cities in view of short commute times, least pollution, safety and healthcare.

== Geography ==
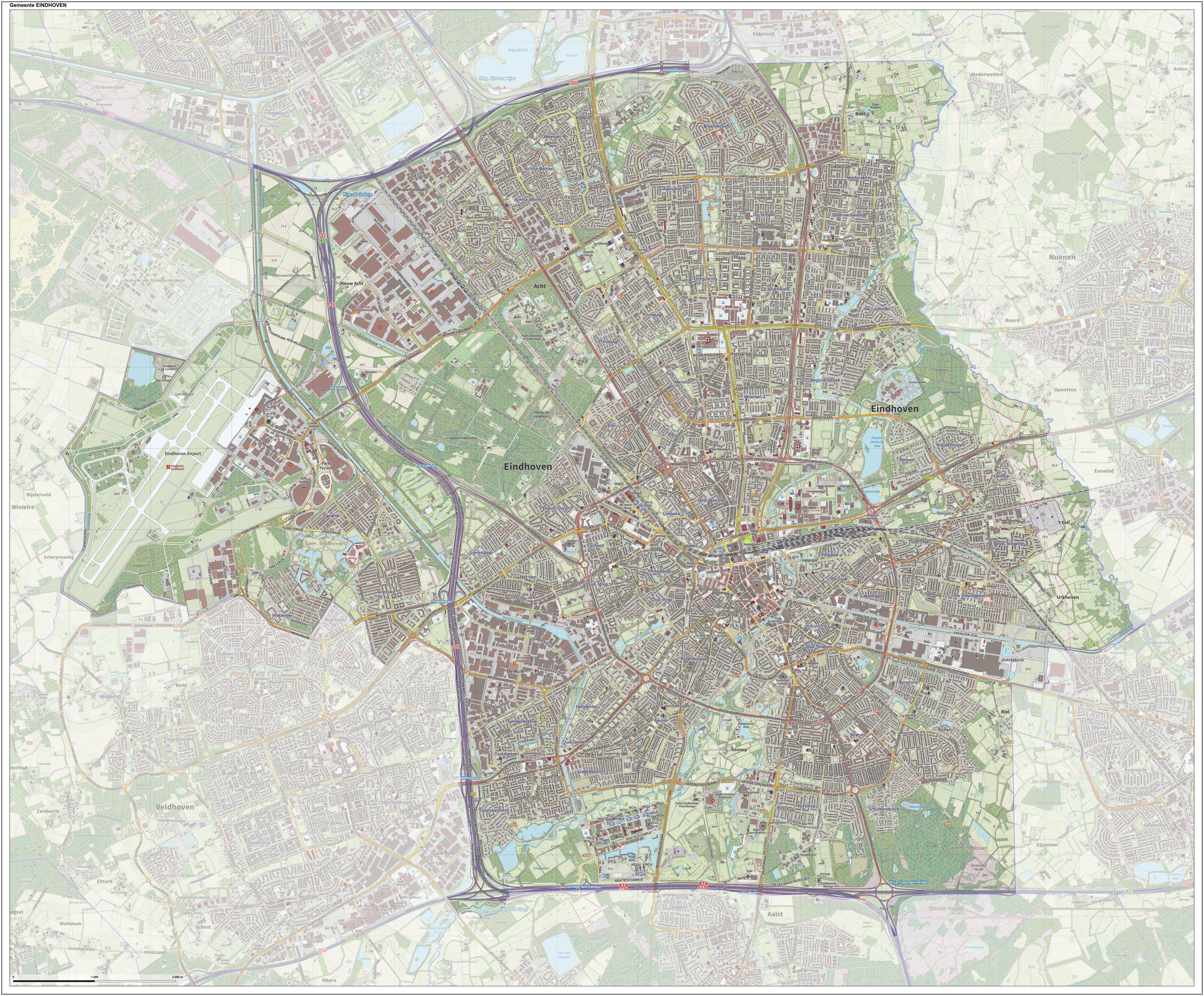
Topographic map of Eindhoven (city), 2022

The villages and city that make up modern Eindhoven were originally built on sandy elevations between the Dommel, Gender and Tongelreep rivers. Beginning in the 19th century, the basins of the rivers themselves have also been used as housing land, resulting in occasional flooding in the city centre. Partly to reduce flooding, the bed of the Gender stream, which flowed directly through the city centre, was dammed off and filled up after the War, and the course of the Dommel was regulated. New ecological and socio-historical insights have led to parts of the Dommel's course being restored to their original states, and plans to have the Gender flow through the centre once again.

The large-scale housing developments of the 20th century saw residential areas being built on former agricultural lands and woods, former heaths that had been turned into cultivable lands in the 19th century.

The city is currently divided into seven districts:

- 1. Centrum
- 2. Woensel-Noord
- 3. Woensel-Zuid
- 4. Tongelre
- 5. Stratum
- 6. Gestel
- 7. Strijp

=== Climate ===
Eindhoven has an oceanic climate with slightly warmer summers and cooler winters than the coastal parts of the Netherlands. Its all-time record is 40.3 °C (104.5 °F) set on 25 July 2019 and −21.7 °C (−7.1 °F) set on 13 January 1968, while winter lows have dipped below −15 °C (5 °F) during extreme cold snaps. Although frosts are frequent in winter, there is no lasting snow cover in a normal winter due to the mild daytime temperatures.

Climate data for Eindhoven (1991−2020 normals, extremes 1951−present)
Month	Jan	Feb	Mar	Apr	May	Jun	Jul	Aug	Sep	Oct	Nov	Dec	Year
Record high °C (°F)	16.9 (62.4)	19.9 (67.8)	25.3 (77.5)	29.1 (84.4)	33.4 (92.1)	35.1 (95.2)	40.4 (104.7)	36.6 (97.9)	34.0 (93.2)	27.0 (80.6)	20.6 (69.1)	16.4 (61.5)	40.4 (104.7)
Mean daily maximum °C (°F)	6.1 (43.0)	7.2 (45.0)	11.0 (51.8)	15.5 (59.9)	19.2 (66.6)	22.0 (71.6)	24.0 (75.2)	23.7 (74.7)	20.1 (68.2)	15.2 (59.4)	10.0 (50.0)	6.6 (43.9)	15.0 (59.0)
Daily mean °C (°F)	3.4 (38.1)	3.8 (38.8)	6.6 (43.9)	10.1 (50.2)	13.9 (57.0)	16.7 (62.1)	18.6 (65.5)	18.2 (64.8)	14.9 (58.8)	11.0 (51.8)	6.9 (44.4)	4.1 (39.4)	10.7 (51.3)
Mean daily minimum °C (°F)	0.4 (32.7)	0.3 (32.5)	2.1 (35.8)	4.3 (39.7)	7.9 (46.2)	10.8 (51.4)	12.9 (55.2)	12.4 (54.3)	9.7 (49.5)	6.8 (44.2)	3.5 (38.3)	1.2 (34.2)	6.0 (42.8)
Record low °C (°F)	−21.7 (−7.1)	−21.6 (−6.9)	−14.7 (5.5)	−5.9 (21.4)	−2.6 (27.3)	0.3 (32.5)	2.9 (37.2)	3.6 (38.5)	−0.9 (30.4)	−6.4 (20.5)	−9.6 (14.7)	−17.4 (0.7)	−21.7 (−7.1)
Average precipitation mm (inches)	65.2 (2.57)	60.4 (2.38)	52.0 (2.05)	41.0 (1.61)	56.2 (2.21)	62.6 (2.46)	75.7 (2.98)	73.2 (2.88)	58.9 (2.32)	61.2 (2.41)	67.7 (2.67)	75.4 (2.97)	749.5 (29.51)
Average precipitation days (≥ 0.1 mm)	16	14	16	13	13	14	14	13	14	15	17	17	176
Average snowy days (≥ 0.1 cm)	6	6	4	1	0	—	—	—	—	0	2	5	24
Average relative humidity (%)	86.8	83.9	78.4	71.9	71.8	73.2	74.4	76.7	81.4	85.2	89.1	89.1	80.2
Mean monthly sunshine hours	69.0	87.9	139.8	186.4	214.4	209.0	213.2	199.1	161.0	122.4	73.4	56.5	1,732.1
Percentage possible sunshine	26.4	31.1	37.8	44.9	44.4	42.1	42.7	43.9	42.3	36.9	27.3	23.0	36.9
Source: Royal Netherlands Meteorological Institute

== Demographics ==
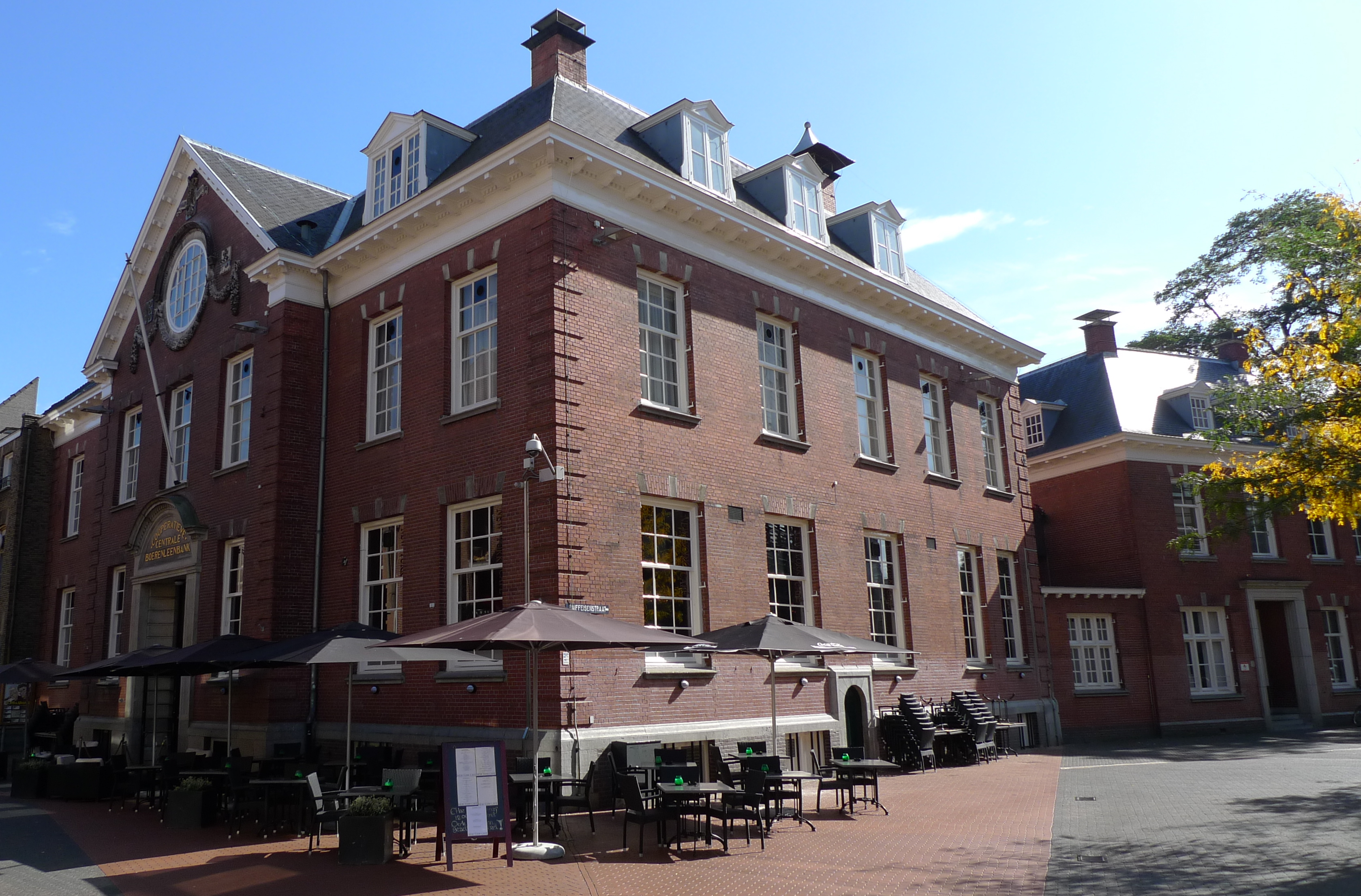
The (now monumental) former building of the Boerenleenbank in the Raiffeisenstraat (in the Centrum).

=== Population ===
As of 2025, the population of Eindhoven consisted of 372,720 people (according to AlleCijfers.nl). Of these, 28% or some 104,804 people were of (partial) foreign descent in 2023.

People are classified as being of foreign descent when they were born outside of the Netherlands, or when at least one of their parents was born outside of the Netherlands.

Population in 2025 by country of birth of parent (mother, or—if mother is Dutch—father) (2025)
Country/territory	Population
Netherlands	134,959
Turkey	13,581
India	9,214
Morocco	6,975
Indonesia	5,631
Soviet Union	5,239
Poland	4,956
Germany	4,682
China	4,167
Suriname	3,776
Syria	3,293
(Netherlands) Dutch Caribbean	3,275
Belgium	2,760
Spain	2,309
(Socialist Federal Republic of Yugoslavia) Yugoslavia	2,132

The municipal agglomeration of Eindhoven (an administrative construct which includes only some of the surrounding towns and villages) has 327,245 inhabitants as of 1 January 2010.

The spoken language is a combination of Kempenlands (a Dutch dialect spoken in a large area east and south east of the city, including Arendonk and Lommel in Belgium) and North Meierijs (between the south of Den Bosch and into Eindhoven). Both dialects belong to the East Brabantian dialect group), which is very similar to colloquial Dutch).

Urban development
Year	Population
1996	197,374
2000	201,728
2005	208,455
2010	213,809
2015	223,209
2020	234,394
2021	235,691
2022	238,326
2023	243,730
2024	246,443

=== Inhabitants by origin ===
2020	Numbers	%
Dutch natives	146,443	62.48%
Western migration background	36,057	15.38%
Non-Western migration background	51,894	22.14%
Turkey	11,295	4.82%
Morocco	6,451	2.75%
Indonesia	5,934	
Suriname	3,748	
Netherlands Antilles and Aruba	2,925	
Total	234 394	100%

=== Districts ===
Of all Eindhoven districts, the historical centre is by far the smallest in size and population, numbering only 5,419 in 2006. Woensel-Noord is the largest, having been the city's main area of expansion for several decades.

Population figures for all districts, as of 1 January 2008, ranked by size:

1. Woensel-Noord (65,429)
2. Woensel-Zuid (35,789)
3. Stratum (31,778)
4. Gestel (26,590)
5. Strijp (25,402)
6. Tongelre (19,680)
7. Centrum (5,757)

=== Religion ===
Eindhoven is located in the southeast of the province of North Brabant. This area is historically Catholic and the population of Eindhoven was similarly mostly Catholic for a very long time until the late 1970s. However, the internationalizing influence of the university, Philips and other companies have created a more mixed population over the last few decades.

Religion in Eindhoven (2015)
1. No religious denomination (45.0%)
2. Catholic Church (36.9%)
3. Protestant Church in the Netherlands (2.50%)
4. Other Christian denominations (2.40%)
5. Islam (8.00%)
6. Hinduism (0.80%)
7. Buddhism (0.50%)
8. Other (3.90%)

The spiritual needs of the Eindhoven population are tended to by a steadily shrinking number of churches, two mosques and one synagogue.

=== Crime ===
In research by the Dutch newspaper Algemeen Dagblad based on the police's statistical data on crime rates, Eindhoven was found to have the highest crime rate in the Netherlands for 2006, 2007, 2009, and 2010. In 2011, Eindhoven has slipped down the list to number six.

From 2010 - 2021, in the Eindhoven agglomeration, crime numbers came down considerably.

=== Languages ===
- Standard Dutch
- Eindhoven does not have its own, uniform dialect. Varieties of the Brabantian dialect used to be spoken in the former villages of Gestel, Woensel and Stratum, but are now almost extinct. The closest city to Eindhoven in which Brabantian is spoken is Helmond.

== Economy ==
Eindhoven has grown from a small town in 1232 to one of the biggest cities in the Netherlands with over 240,000 inhabitants in 2022. Much of its growth is due to Philips, DAF Trucks and Brabantia. Among recent high-tech companies based in Eindhoven are NXP Semiconductors, Sendcloud, and Signify.

After the resurrection of the Netherlands in 1815 and the end of the Belgian Revolution, Eindhoven was a small village of some 1250 people in an economically backward and mostly agricultural area. Cheap land, cheap labor and the existence of pre-industrial homesourcing (huisnijverheid in Dutch) made Eindhoven an attractive area for the developing industries which were being stimulated by the government of King William I. During the 19th century, Eindhoven grew into an industrial town with factories for textile weaving, cigar manufacturing, match making and hat making. Most of these industries disappeared again after World War II, though.

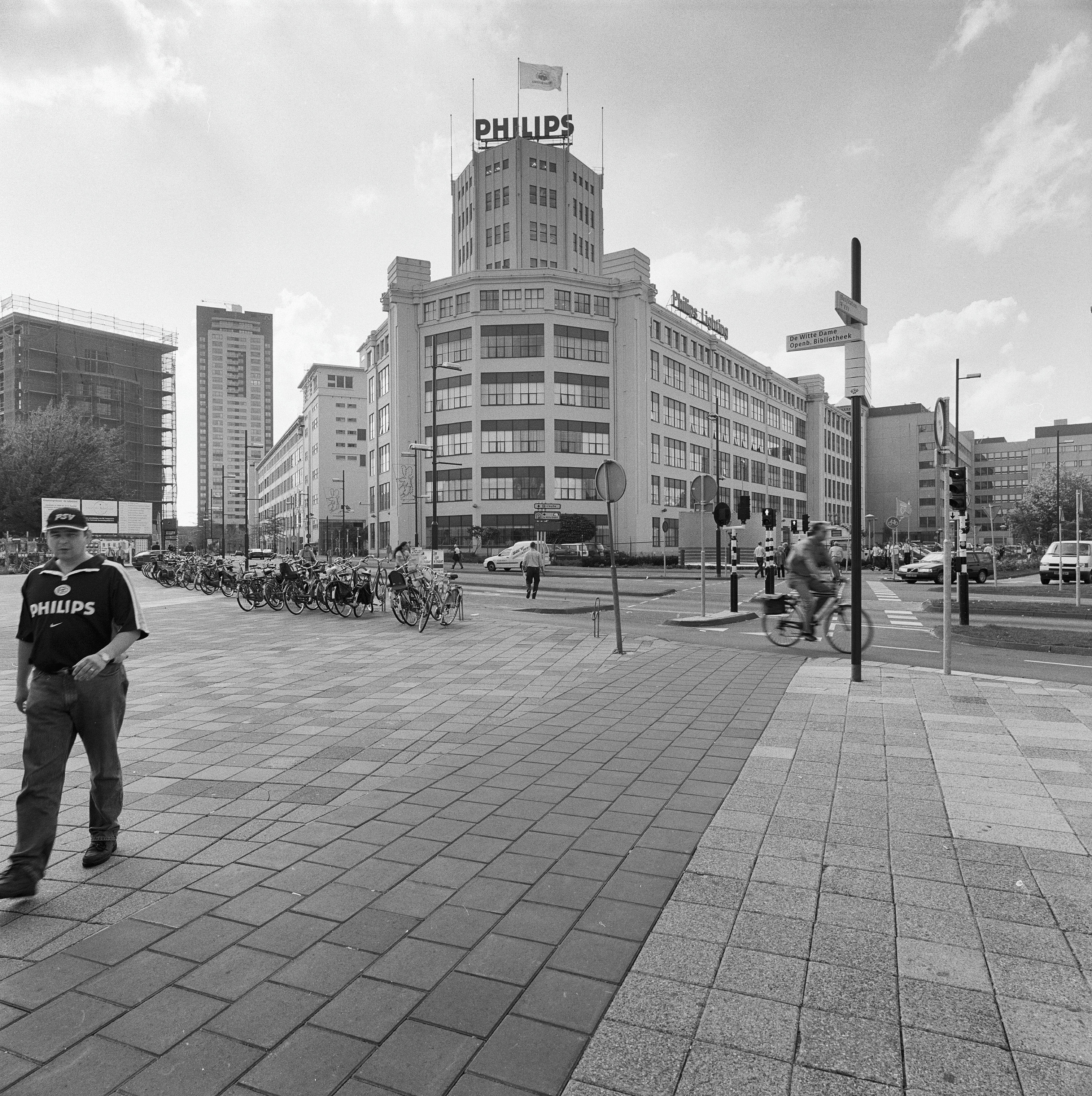
Light Tower in 2000

In 1891, brothers Gerard and Anton Philips founded the small light bulb factory that would grow into one of the largest electronics firms in the world. Philips' presence is probably the largest single contributing factor to the major growth of Eindhoven in the 20th century. It attracted and spun off many hi-tech companies, making Eindhoven a major technology and industrial hub. In 2005, a full third of the total amount of money spent on research in the Netherlands was spent in or around Eindhoven. A quarter of the jobs in the region are in technology and information technology, with companies such as FEI Company (once Philips Electron Optics), NXP Semiconductors (formerly Philips Semiconductors), ASML, ALTEN, Simac, Neways Electronics and the aforementioned Philips and DAF.

Eindhoven has long been a centre of cooperation between research institutes and industry. This tradition started with Philips (the NatLab was a physical expression of this) and has since expanded to large cooperative networks. The Eindhoven University of Technology hosts an incubator for technology startups and the NatLab has developed into the High Tech Campus Eindhoven. Also, TNO has opened a branch on the university campus. This tradition has also fostered inter-industry cooperation in the region; one example of this is the announcement in September 2010 of a new research lab for high-grade packaging materials, a cooperation of IPS Packaging and Thales Cryogenics.

This cooperative tradition has also developed into a different direction than the traditional technology research done at the university. Starting in 2002, the university, the Catharina hospital, Philips Medical and the University of Maastricht joined forces and started joint research into biomedical science, technology and engineering. Within Eindhoven, this research has been concentrated in a new university faculty (BioMedical Technology or BMT). This development has also made Eindhoven a biomedical technology hub within the country and its (European) region.

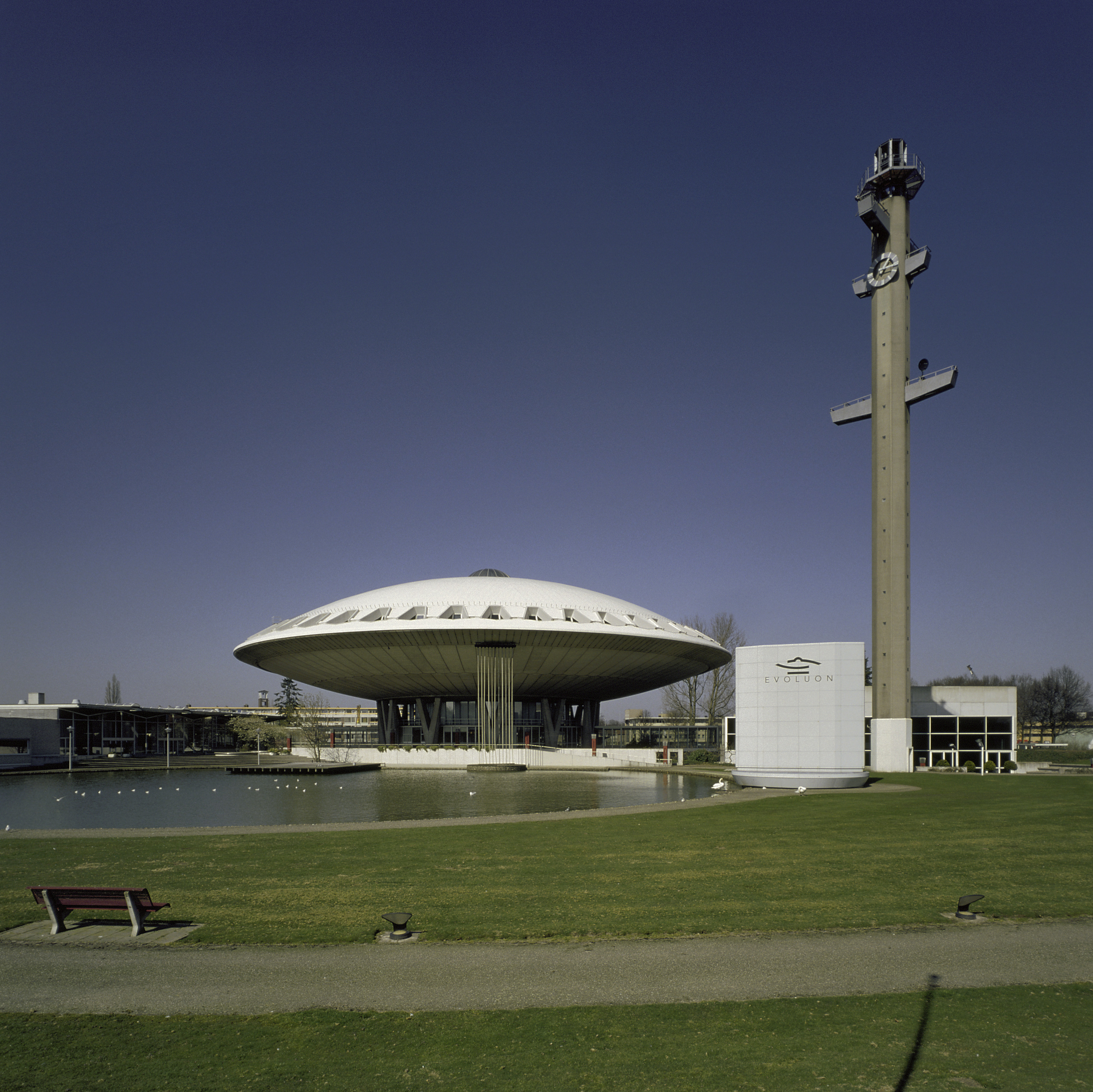
The Evoluon building initially hosted a science museum; it is now a conference centre.

Prime examples of industrial heritage in Eindhoven are the renovated Witte Dame ("White Lady") complex, a former Philips lamp factory; and the Admirant building (informally known as Bruine Heer or "Brown Gentleman" in reference to the Witte Dame across the street), the former Philips main offices. The Witte Dame currently houses the municipal library, the Design Academy and a selection of shops. The Admirant has been renovated into an Office building for small companies. Across the street from the Witte Dame and next to the Admirant is Philips' first light bulb factory (nicknamed Roze Baby, or "Pink Baby", in reference to its pink colour and much smaller size when compared to the "White Lady" and "Brown Gentleman"). The small building now houses the "Centrum Kunstlicht in de Kunst" (centre artificial light in art) and the "Philips Incandescent Lamp Factory of 1891" museum.

=== Knowledge economy initiatives ===
Due to its high-tech environment, Eindhoven is part of several initiatives to develop, foster and increase a knowledge economy. Chief among these are:

- Brainport Top Technology Region, a cooperative initiative of local government, industry and the Eindhoven University of Technology to develop the local knowledge economy of the Eindhoven region.
- Brainport Development, an extension of the Top Technology Region, Brainport Development serves as the Eindhoven's regional innovation agency to maintain its position as an innovation hub.
- Samenwerkingsverband Regio Eindhoven, a cooperative agreement among the municipalities in the Eindhoven metropolitan area.
- The Eindhoven-Leuven-Aachen triangle, a cooperation agreement between the universities and surrounding regions of Eindhoven, Leuven (Belgium) and Aachen (Germany).

The Intelligent Community Forum named the Eindhoven metro region the No. 21 intelligent community in 2008 and the No. 7 intelligent community in 2009 and 2010. In 2011, the ICF named Eindhoven the Intelligent Community of the Year. Since 2012, Eindhoven has vanished from the top 7 of intelligent communities.

=== EIT co-location ===
Eindhoven is one of the co-location centres of the European Institute of Innovation and Technology (EIT). It hosts two Knowledge and Innovation Communities (KICs): Innoenergy (Sustainable Energy) and EIT ICT Labs (Information and Communication Technology). The co-locations are on the High Tech Campus Eindhoven.

== Education ==
Eindhoven, being a city with a 240,000+ population, is served by a large number of schools both at primary and secondary education levels. In addition, Eindhoven is a higher-education hub within the southern Netherlands, with several institutes of higher education that serve students from the extended region of North Brabant, Zeeland, Limburg and parts of the surrounding provinces.

=== Primary education ===
Primary education is provided to the children aged 4 to 12 in Eindhoven through a large number of primary schools:

Area	Gestel	Stratum	Strijp	Tongelre	Woensel
Schools	SALTO school De Hobbitstee; SKPO school De Kameleon; SKPO school De Springplank; SALTO school De Trinoom; SKPO school De Troubadour; SALTO school Hanevoet; SKPO school Karel de Grote; The Regional international school; SKPO school 't Startblok	SKPO school Beppino Sarto; SALTO school De Hasselbraam; SALTO school De Klimboom; VSEZ school De Regenboog; SKPO school De Talisman; SKPO school De Wilakkers; SALTO school De Zevensprong; SALTO school basisschool Floralaan	SALTO school De Bergen; SKPO school De Schakel; SALTO school De Startbaan; SALTO school Drents Dorp; SKPO school 't Slingertouw; SKPO school Theresia; SKPO school Trudo	SKPO school De Boog; SALTO school De Driesprong; SALTO school Nutsschool Reigerlaan; SKPO school BoschAkker; SALTO school 't Karregat	SKPO school Atalanta; SALTO school Cornelis Jetses; SKPO school De Bijenkorf; SKPO school De Boschuil; SALTO school De Driestam; SKPO school De Handreiking; SALTO school De Klapwiek; SKPO school De Korenaar; SALTO school De Ontmoeting; SALTO school De Opbouw; SKPO school De Schelp; SALTO school De Tempel; SALTO school De Vuurvlinder; SEOO school Evangelische Basisschool Online; SKPO school Fellenoord; SKPO school Gunterslaer; SKPO school Klimwijs; SALTO school Louis Buelens; SKPO school Onder de Wieken; SKPO school Rapenland; SKPO school St. Antonius Abt; SKPO school 't Palet; Islamic school Tarieq Ibnoe Ziyad; SKPO school Tweelingen; VSB school Vrije School Brabant; SKPO school Wethouder van Eupen

- Special needs primary education:
  - SALTO school Jan Nieuwenhuizen
  - SKPO school De Reis van Brandaan
  - SKPO school Petraschool
  - SALTO school De Vijfkamp

=== Secondary education ===
Secondary education is provided to the children aged 12 to 18 in Eindhoven through several highschools:

Area	Gestel	Stratum	Strijp	Tongelre	Woensel
Schools	Huygens Lyceum; Aloysius/De Roosten; Van Maerlant Lyceum; Heliconopleidingen "Groenschool"	SG Augustinianum; De Burgh; Sint-Joris College	Sint Lucas Eindhoven; Montessori College ROC Eindhoven; Olympia	Lorentz Casimir Lyceum	Frits Philips Lyceum; Eckartcollege; Novalis College; De Rooi Pannen; Stedelijk College Eindhoven; International Secondary School Eindhoven

Special needs secondary education:

- Sondervickcollege, Locatie de Stolberg
- De Korenaer
- Mgr. Bekkers
- De Beemden
- Mytylschool
- Antoon Schellens College
- Praktijkschool Eindhoven
- VSO Ekkersbeek
- Instituut 'St. Marie'

=== Higher and adult education ===
Eindhoven hosts four different public institutions for higher and adult education, as well as a number of private institutions offering courses and trainings. The public institutions hosted in Eindhoven are:

- Design Academy.
- Eindhoven University of Technology.
- Fontys University of Applied Sciences (Eindhoven branch).
- Tio University
- SintLucas
- Summa College

The Open University also has a study centre in Eindhoven.

Among the private institutions is the Centrum voor Kunsten Eindhoven, which offers art-related courses to adults (including a DJ-education).

== Politics ==
=== Municipal council ===
The municipal council is the legislative council at the municipal level in Eindhoven; its existence is mandated by the Constitution of the Netherlands. The Eindhoven city council consists of 45 elected representatives from the Eindhoven municipality. These are elected during municipal elections from candidates running in Eindhoven. Eindhoven politics consists of local branches of the national political parties and purely local parties with strictly local interests. The city council reflects this mix in its makeup.

Group	Seats
Progressive Netherlands	13 / 45
Christian Democratic Appeal	9 / 45
Democrats 66	7 / 45
People's Party for Freedom and Democracy	4 / 45
Forum for Democracy	4 / 45
50PLUS	3 / 45
Socialist Party	1 / 45
Party for the Animals	1 / 45
Eindhoven Voor Elkaar	1 / 45
Volt Netherlands	1 / 45
Ouderen Appèl Eindhoven	1 / 45
Source: Municipal Council

=== Municipal executive ===
==== Alder(wo)men ====
The executive council in Dutch municipalities is called the College of the Mayor and Aldermen (Dutch: College van Burgemeester en Wethouders or College van B&W for short). The mayor is appointed by the monarch, but the council of aldermen is composed as a result of the formation of a local coalition government. This coalition is formed in such a way as to be able to rely on a majority of the votes in the city council.

2014 – 2018

In May 2014, a coalition was formed between PvdA, D66, SP, and GreenLeft. Together they had 26 seats in the city council. The council of alder(wo)men consisted of the following people:

- Staf Depla (PvdA): economy, work and income and vocational education
- Yasin Torunoglu (PvdA): living, boroughs, space and citizen participation
- Marco van Dorst replaced by Wilbert Seuren in July 2015 (both D66): spatial planning and treasury
- Mary-Ann Schreurs (D66): innovation and design, sustainability and culture
- Bianca van Kaathoven (SP): active city, diversity and permits
- Jannie Visscher (SP): youth, education, traffic and transport
- Lenie Scholten (GreenLeft): health care and WIJeindhoven

2018 – 2022

In May 2018, a coalition was formed existing of VVD, GreenLeft, PvdA, and CDA. They had 26 seats together. The alder(wo)men were:

- Monique List (VVD)
- Marcel Oosterveer (VVD)
- Renate Richters (GreenLeft)
- Jan van der Veer replaced by Rik Thijs in June 2019 (both GreenLeft)
- Yasin Torunoglu (PvdA)
- Stijn Steenbakkers (CDA)

2022 – 2026

In June 2022, a coalition has been formed existing of GreenLeft, CDA, PvdA, and D66, having 25 seats together. Their alder(wo)men have been:

- Saskia Lammers (GreenLeft): well-being, work, poverty, culture and design
- Rik Thijs (GreenLeft): climate, energy, soil and greening
- Samir Toub (GreenLeft): diversity, care, youth and social support
- Maes van Lanschot (CDA): finance, sport, heritage and regional cooperation
- Stijn Steenbakkers (CDA): brainport, economy, education, KnoopXL and Eindhoven-Northwest
- Mieke Verhees (PvdA): housing, neighbourhoods, space and services
- Monique Esselbrugge (D66): higher and vocational education, mobility, city centre and Design District

2026 - 2030

After the 2026 municipal elections a coalition between PRO (progressivism), CDA (christian democratic) and D66 (social liberal) was formed in the aftermath.

Name	Party	Portfolio
Jeroen Dijsselbloem	Pro	Mayor
Rik Thijs	Pro	Alderman; Climate and energy, green and water, MBO/HBO/WO, work and labor market
Mieke Verhees	Pro	Alderwoman; Housing, spatial planning, land and real estate, social development, health
Samir Toub	Pro	Alderman; Youth and education, asylum, poverty, inclusion
Stijn Steenbakkers	CDA	Alderman; Brainport, economy, leap in scale, city center, area developments within the Ring
Remco van Dooren	CDA	Alderman; Finance, neighbourhoods, well-being, sports, heritage
Robert Strijk	D66	Alderman; Mobility, organisation and digitalisation, city marketing, student affairs
Mariëlle Giesbertz	D66	Alderwoman; Culture and design, Wmo, resident participation, regional cooperation

==== Mayor ====
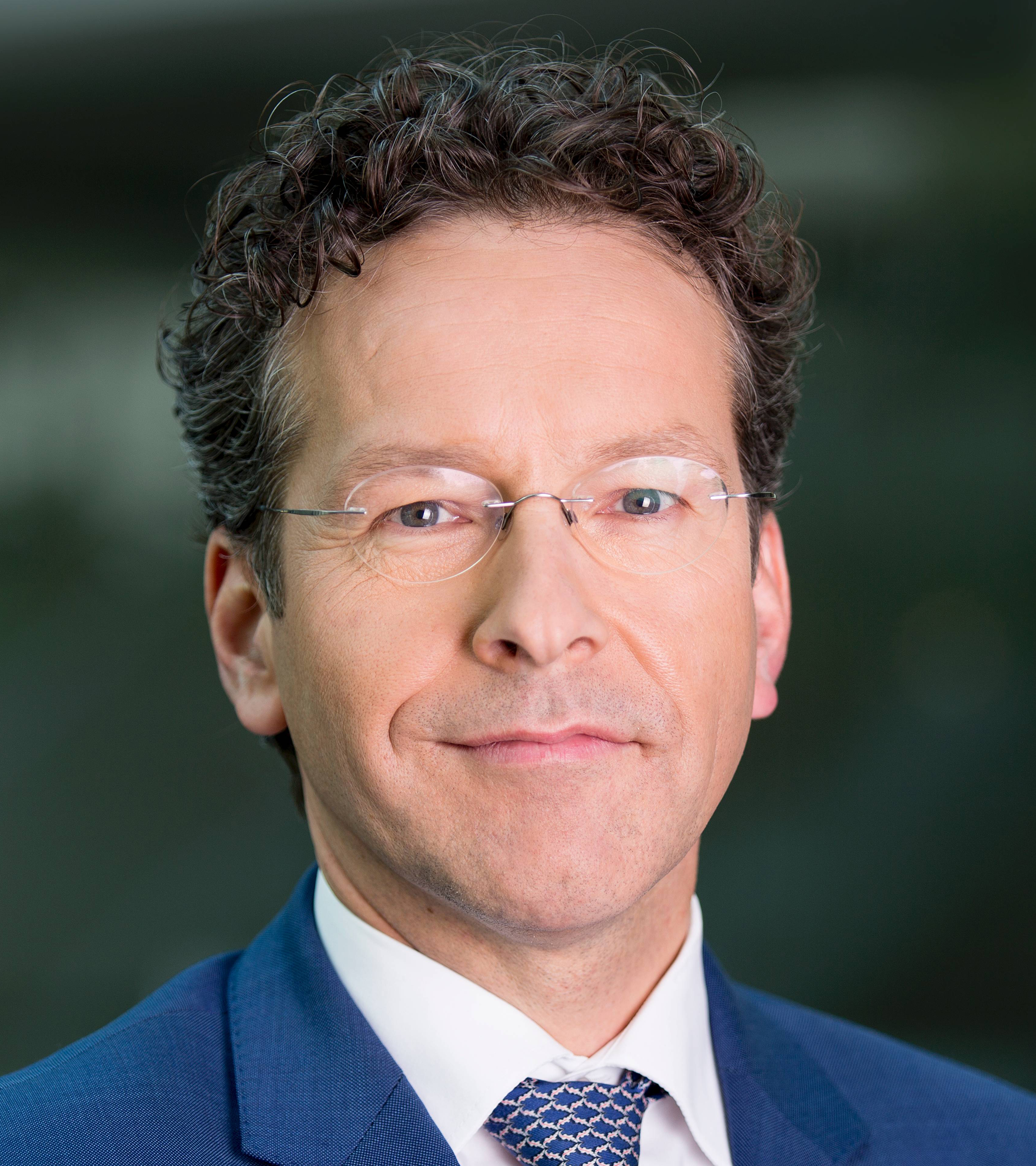
Mayor Jeroen Dijsselbloem

The mayors of the Netherlands are not elected but appointed by the crown. Nevertheless, there has been a movement over the last few years to give the municipalities more say in who will be their mayor, which has resulted in consultative referendums being held in the larger cities to "suggest" a candidate for the post. This was also tried in Eindhoven.

On 23 January 2008, a referendum to elect a mayor was held in Eindhoven. This referendum, the second of its kind in the Netherlands, was attended by 24.6% of the inhabitants. This was less than the required 30% needed to make a referendum binding. Nevertheless, the city council would choose the winner of the referendum as the preferred candidate. The main reason for the low attendance was that the candidates, Leen Verbeek and Rob van Gijzel, were from the same party (PvdA). Rob van Gijzel won the referendum with 61.8% of the votes and was appointed the city's new mayor.

The mayor is the chairman of the Council of B&W. He also has responsibility for a number of specific posts (like the aldermen). For example, in the executive council of 2014-2018 mayor Van Gijzel held responsibility for the post of communication.

If unavailable, the mayor is temporarily replaced by one of the aldermen.

Rob van Gijzel was succeeded by John Jorritsma (VVD) on 13 September 2016. Jorritsma has been succeeded by Jeroen Dijsselbloem (PvdA) on 13 September 2022.

== Culture and recreation ==
Culturally and recreationally, Eindhoven was formed by two forces:

- Being a university city, Eindhoven has a large student population. The students from the Eindhoven University of Technology and a number of undergraduate schools give Eindhoven a young population, whose recreational needs are catered to by several different festivals, clubs and such.
- For a long time Eindhoven was the main location of Philips. The Philips company undertook a lot of effort in the "cultural formation" of its workforce and has given the city both cultural institutions (such as the former POC and the Muziekcentrum Frits Philips) and sporting institutions (notably PSV).

Eindhoven is also known as the City of Light, due to Philips originating from there and because of several projects involving lighting up buildings of the city. During Carnival, Eindhoven is rechristened Lampegat (Hamlet of Lamps, although for the ironic purposes of carnival the translation Hole in the ground with lamps is closer to the mark); this refers again to the important role of Philips in the Eindhoven community.

=== Cultural institutions ===
There are several cultural institutions in and around the city.

==== Museums ====
- There are two museums dedicated to the major topics of the city's industrial heritage: the DAF Museum has a collection of DAF cars and the Philips Gloeilampenfabriekje anno 1891 (across the street from the Kempenland) documents the early lightbulb industry.
- The former district court house now houses the Designhuis, a public podium and interaction area for modern design and innovation.
- The Eindhoven Museum is an archaeological open-air museum which focuses on the region's Iron Age and Middle Ages. It merged in 2011 with Museum Kempenland which was a regional museum, which documents the history of the Kempenland region in objects, documents, paintings and educational activities. Museum Kempenland's old location, the Steentjeskerk, is closed.
- The Inkijkmuseum (the Look-In museum; housed in an old linen factory in the Dommelstraat) is a small but special museum: it offers ever-changing exhibits, which are to be viewed through the building's windows.
- The Van Abbemuseum has a collection of modern and contemporary art, including works by Picasso, Kandinsky, Mondriaan and Chagall.
- De Ontdekfabriek (Discovery Factory) children's museum at Strijp-S

Eindhoven was home to the Evoluon science museum, sponsored by Philips. The Evoluon building has evolved into a conference centre.

==== Open-air art ====
The Eindhoven public space contains many forms of artistic expression (a book published by the Eindhoven tourist board records 550 as of 2001 and more have been added since), with high "concentrations" of them in the parks. The Stadswandelpark for instance, contains over 30 works of modern art. There are also several other works of art on permanent display throughout the city, such as Flying Pins (by Claes Oldenburg and Coosje van Bruggen, who considered the location on the southern stretch of the John F. Kennedylaan to be like a bowling alley) and Swing (a construct on the Karel de Grotelaan, which morphs into different geometric shapes as you move around it). There are also a number of statues of famous city inhabitants, such as Jan van Hooff (by Auke Hettema, 1992) and Frits Philips (by Kees Verkade) on the Market Square. There is a statue of Anton Philips in front of the central railway station.

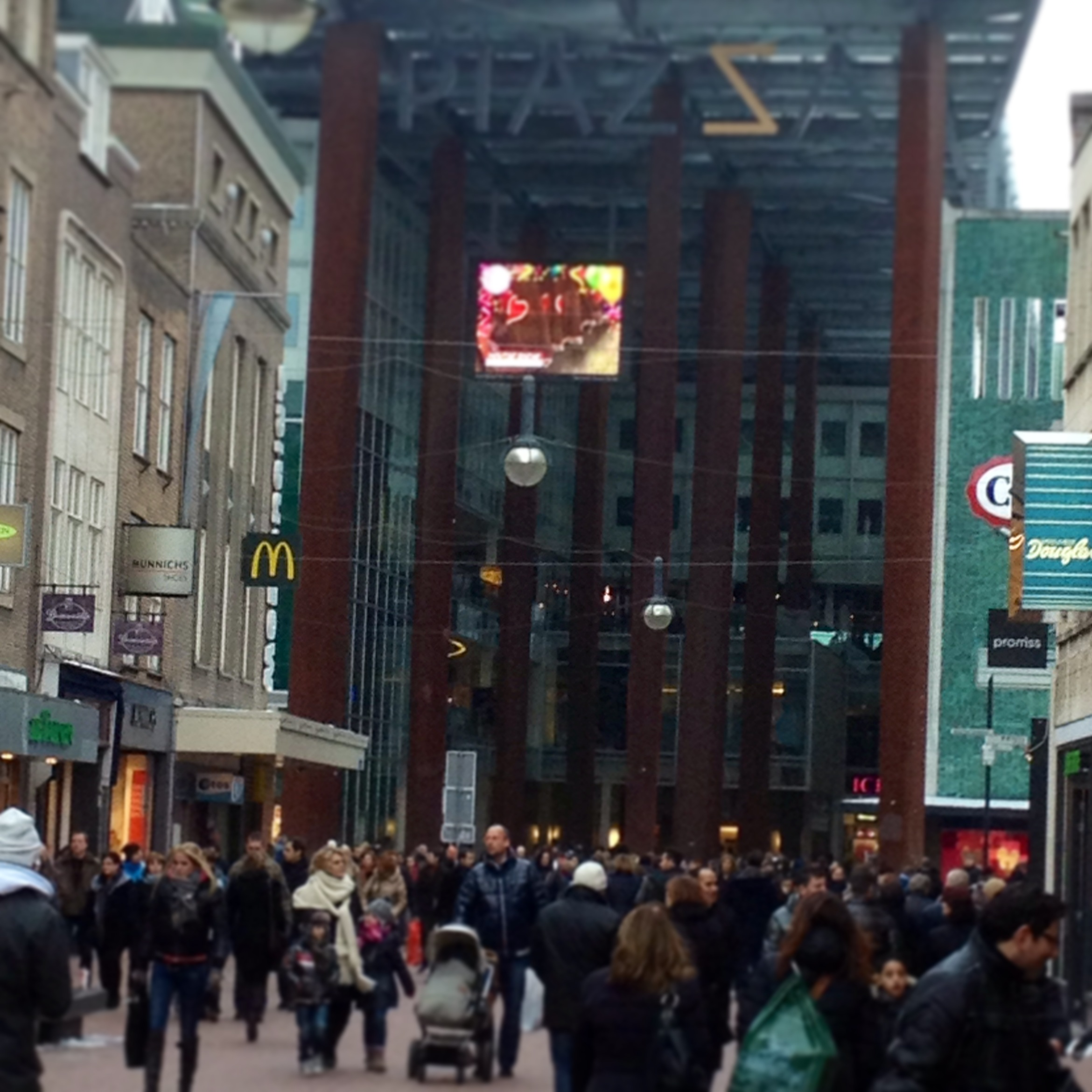
Piazza Centre as seen from Demer

Eindhoven is also, to some degree, open to forms of impromptu and alternative art. For example, the Berenkuil is a freezone for graffiti artists in the city.

===== Light art =====
Strijp-S is a place for experimentation with LED lighting, which keeps the historic connection with Philips' past. Some light art includes the project Fakkel by Har Hollands. In the underground passage to NatLab artist Daan Roosegaarde installed his project Crystal.

Strijp-S is a regular location for the light festival GLOW.

==== Music and theatre ====
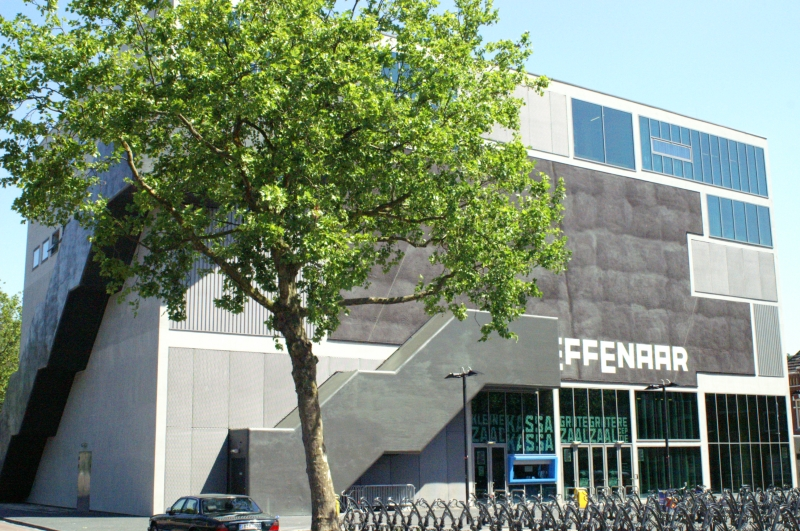
The Effenaar music venue

The Effenaar is a popular music venue and cultural centre in Eindhoven, and is located at the Dommelstraat.

In 1992, the Muziekcentrum Frits Philips was opened as a stage for classical and popular music in Eindhoven, reviewed by critics as a concert hall with acoustics that rival the best halls in Europe. Before that, Philips sponsored the POC.

Parktheater Eindhoven is Eindhoven's stage for opera, cabaret, ballet etc. Opened in 1964, it has received over 250,000 visitors every year. With its 1,000 m^{2} it has one of the largest stages in the Netherlands. With a major renovation ending in 2007, the new Parktheater will receive an estimated 300,000 visitors a year.

Eindhoven's Plaza Futura is now a cinema featuring cultural movies, lectures and special cultural events.

Especially for students, Studium Generale Eindhoven organizes "socially, culturally and intellectually formative events". From within the student body, two Tunas provide entertainment from time to time at university and city events: Tuna Ciudad de Luz (Tuna of the City of Light) and the ladies tuna La Tuniña.

The general music and theatre scene in Eindhoven (in the broadest sense) is supported by a foundation called PopEi. The purpose of this foundation is to support artistic groups with facilities, especially rehearsal stages and areas (housed in the old Philips location of Strijp-S) but also storage facilities. PopEi also provides a working environment for groups (through cafeteria facilities in Strijp-S, so groups can have real working days) and provides some logistical support for organizing events.

=== Recreation ===
Eindhoven has several recreational venues. Bars and pubs are located in areas including the Market square, Stratumseind, Dommelstraat and Wilhelmina Square. Stratumseind has a concentration of pubs and bars. The city centre also includes Plaza Futura and several cinemas, including Servicebioscoop Zien, Vue and Pathé Eindhoven (which includes THX sound, IMAX screens and 3D screenings).

Eindhoven also hosts a large number of cultural and entertainment-oriented festivals. The biggest festivals in Eindhoven are:

- ABlive, popfestival (September)
- Carnaval, (February)
- Koningsdag, National Day (27 April)
- Muziek op de Dommel, classical music festival (June)
- EDIT, festival (June)
- Eindhoven Pride (June)
- Fiesta del Sol, street- and music acts (June)
- UCI ProTour – Eindhoven Team Time Trial, international cycling tour (June)
- Virus Festival, alternative music festival (last edition in 2007, inactive at the moment)
- Dynamo Metal Fest (July)
- Park Hilaria, fun fair (August)
- Folkwoods, folk festival (August)
- Reggae Sundance, reggae festival (August)
- Lichtjesroute, 15-mile-tour of light ornaments, commemorating the liberation of Eindhoven (from 18 September)
- Eindhoven Marathon, (October)
- Dutch Design Week, international school festival (October)
- GLOW Festival Eindhoven
- TROMP international music competition & Festival, international classical music competition & festival (15–23 November 2008: String quartet, Nov 2010: Percussion)
- STRP Festival, art & technology festival (23–25 November 2007)

=== Parks ===
Eindhoven contains several parks and a lot of open, green space. Of the five largest cities in the Netherlands, it has the highest percentage of green area (encompassing about a third of all public space). It is also the greenest of the five largest cities in North Brabant. The green area per house is about 100 square metres (1,100 square feet).

Some of the major parks in Eindhoven are the Stadswandelpark, Genneper Parken, the Philips van Lenneppark, Philips de Jongh Wandelpark and the Henri Dunantpark. There is also a green area surrounding the Karpendonkse Plas (a water area). The combination of park area, water and general atmosphere got the Ooievaarsnest neighborhood elected the "Best large-city neighborhood of the Netherlands" by the NRC Handelsblad in 1997.

=== Sport ===
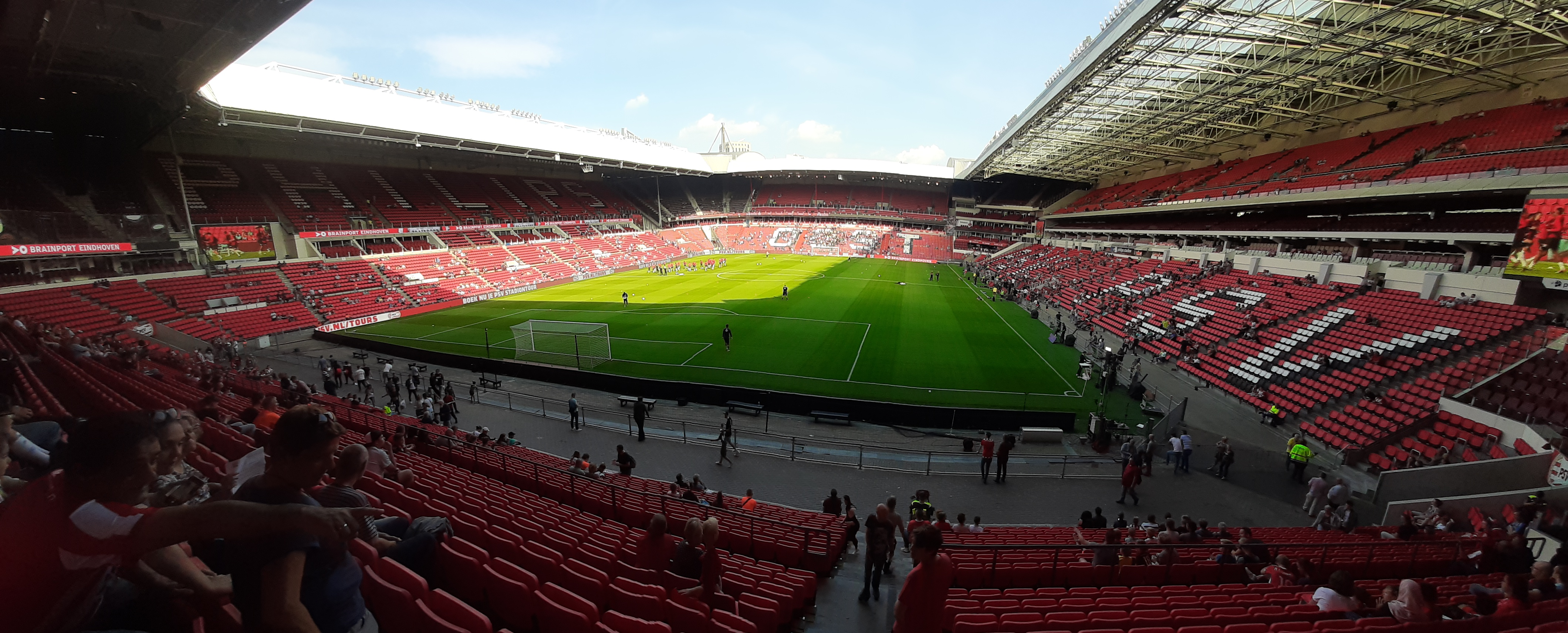
The Philips Stadion

- The premier sporting club of the city is PSV Eindhoven, the professional football club playing in the Eredivisie. Their home base is the Philips Stadion. PSV won the 1988 European Cup as well as 27 Dutch championships.
- FC Eindhoven is another football club based in Eindhoven, currently playing in the Eerste Divisie.
- HC Oranje-Rood is the biggest field hockey club in Eindhoven and in fact one of the biggest clubs in the Netherlands. It is a combination of former clubs Oranje Zwart and EMHC. Oranje Zwart's men's team was the reigning Dutch champion for the past 3 years (14/15/16). They also won the EHL in 2015.
- Eindhoven Kemphanen is the major ice hockey club in the city. They play in IJssportcentrum Eindhoven and compete in the North Sea Cup.
- Eindhoven High Techs are the minor league affiliate of the Eindhoven Kemphanen and play in the Eerste Divisie.
- Swimming pool complex De Tongelreep houses various pools for recreation, training and sports research supported by the Eindhoven University of Technology and several top sporting institutions. Its "Pieter van den Hoogenband Swimming Stadium" hosted the 2008 European Championships Swimming, Diving and Synchronised Swimming, the 2010 IPC Swimming World Championships, the 2010 European Short Course Swimming Championships, the 2012 European Championships Waterpolo, Diving and Synchronised Swimming, the 2013 FINA Swimming World Cup, the 2014 IPC European Swimming Championships, the 2017 FINA Swimming World Cup and the 2018 FINA Swimming World Cup.
- Eindhoven houses Europe's largest indoor skateboard park Area 51 (skatepark) and is home of a lively skateboard culture.
- Eindhoven has two boxing clubs, The Golden Gloves and Muscle Fit.
- Eindhoven hosted the 1999 World Table Tennis Championships.
- Eindhoven Shamrocks Gaelic Football Club are an amateur sports team. The club was founded in 2013 and is based at Oude Bosschebaan 32, 5624 AA in Eindhoven. The club is affiliated to the European County Board of the Gaelic Athletic Association. The Shamrocks have won the Benelux Shield Competition in 2017.
- Eindhoven has a baseball club called PSV, which plays at the stadium which co-hosted the 2005 IBAF Baseball World Cup.
- Eindhoven has an American Football team, Eindhoven Raptors, which plays at the 1st division in the Dutch American Football League.
- Strijp-S is a magnet for urban sports like skateboarding, BMX and bouldering as well as bootcamp classes.
- Eindhoven has two Rugby union Clubs ESRC The Elephants a student rugby club associated with the Eindhoven University of Technology and Rugbyclub Eindhoven formerly known as RCE/PSV.

=== Adult-orientated entertainment ===
The centre of town features two casinos (one branch of Holland Casino and the independent Casino4Events). At the A67 a Jack's casino is located.

There is a red light district on the Baekelandplein, as well as four brothels throughout the city. There is also a blue movie theater.

=== Strijp-S ===
The old Philips factory complex has been transformed into a multi-purpose cultural and residential complex called Strijp-S. This includes conference and event space, space for concerts and events, art of lighting, space for sports such as BMX, bouldering, and more, a walking promenade, etc.

== Media ==
Eindhoven features several print media. The local newspaper, called the Eindhovens Dagblad, is a daily newspaper with over 110,000 subscribers in the Samenwerkingsverband Regio Eindhoven region. It has a national and international section, as well as a section dedicated to regional news; the editorial department is located in Eindhoven.

In addition to the newspaper, Eindhoven is served by a number of weekly door-to-door publications. Chief among these is Groot Eindhoven (which carries publications of the city council, as well as other articles and advertisements). Other than that there are de Trompetter, de Weekendkrant and the ZondagsNieuws. The first two are delivered midweek, the last two are weekend publications.

There are several regional and municipal radio stations. The local radio station is Studio040, whereas Omroep Brabant and RoyaalFM provide regional radio.

Local television is provided by Studio040. Omroep Brabant broadcasts regionally from its television studio in Son.

Internet, television and telephone connectivity is available via cable television, optic fiber and ADSL.

== Transport ==
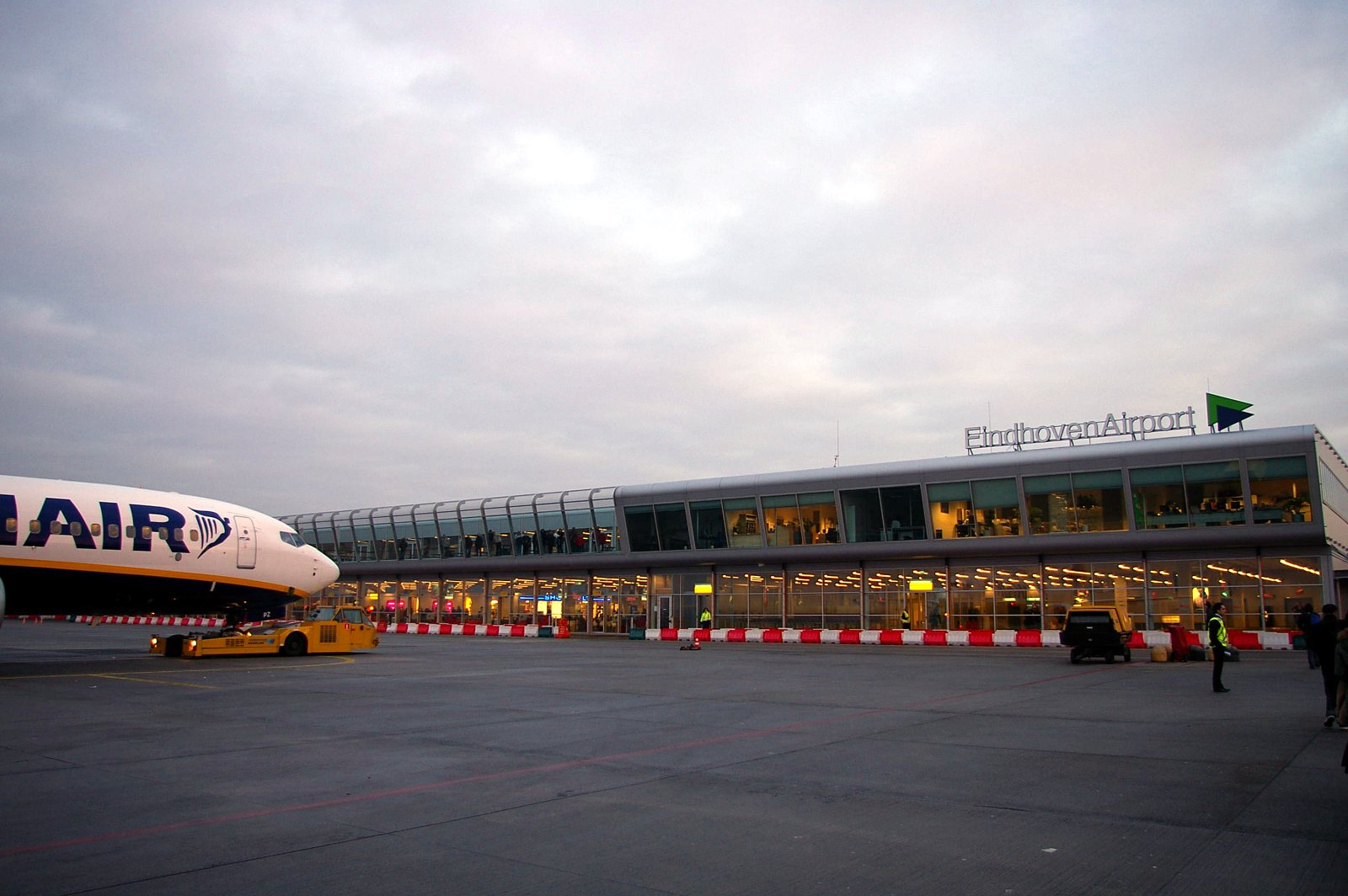
Eindhoven Airport

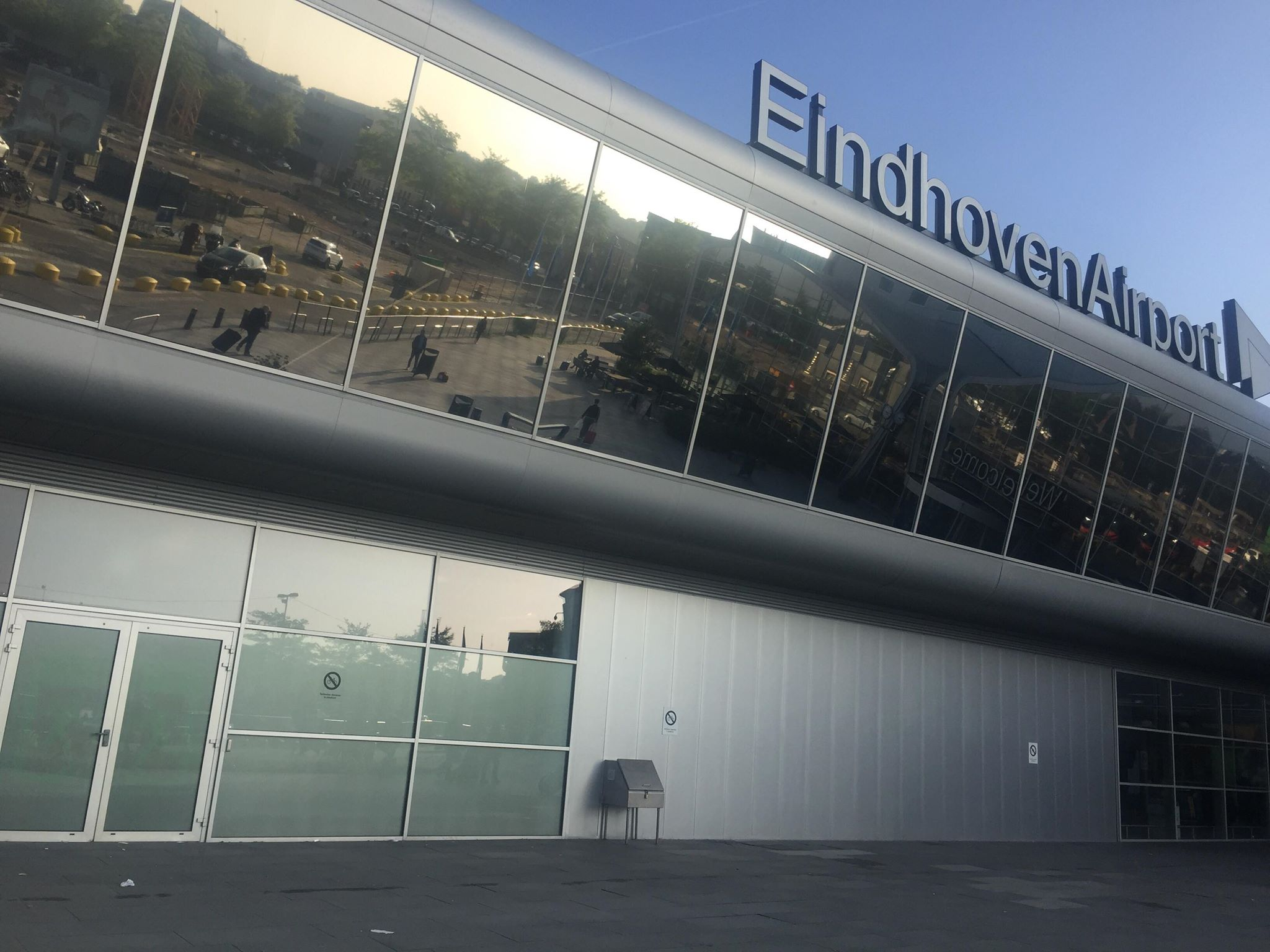
Eindhoven Airport

=== Air traffic ===
Eindhoven Airport is the closest airport, located approximately 8 kilometres (5 miles) from the town centre. The airport serves as a military air base and a civilian commercial airport. Eindhoven Airport is the second-busiest in the Netherlands (after Schiphol).

Ryanair serves London Stansted Airport, Dublin, Kyiv, Rome, Milan, Pisa, Bordeaux, Marseille, Glasgow, Madrid, Valencia, Stockholm, Kaunas, Malta, Sofia and Barcelona. Wizz air serves Belgrade, Brno, Bucharest-Otopeni, Budapest, Cluj-Napoca, Debrecen, Gdańsk, Katowice, Prague, Riga, Sofia, Timișoara, Vilnius, Wrocław. In the summer season, Reykjavík is served with 2 weekly flights operated by Iceland Express. Transavia services Alicante, Antalya, Athens, Bodrum, Corfu, Dalaman, Faro, Gran Canaria, Innsbruck, Málaga, Mallorca, Munich, Prague, Rhodes and Salzburg, though some destinations are served only seasonally. Eindhoven Airport served more than 6.2 million passengers in 2018.

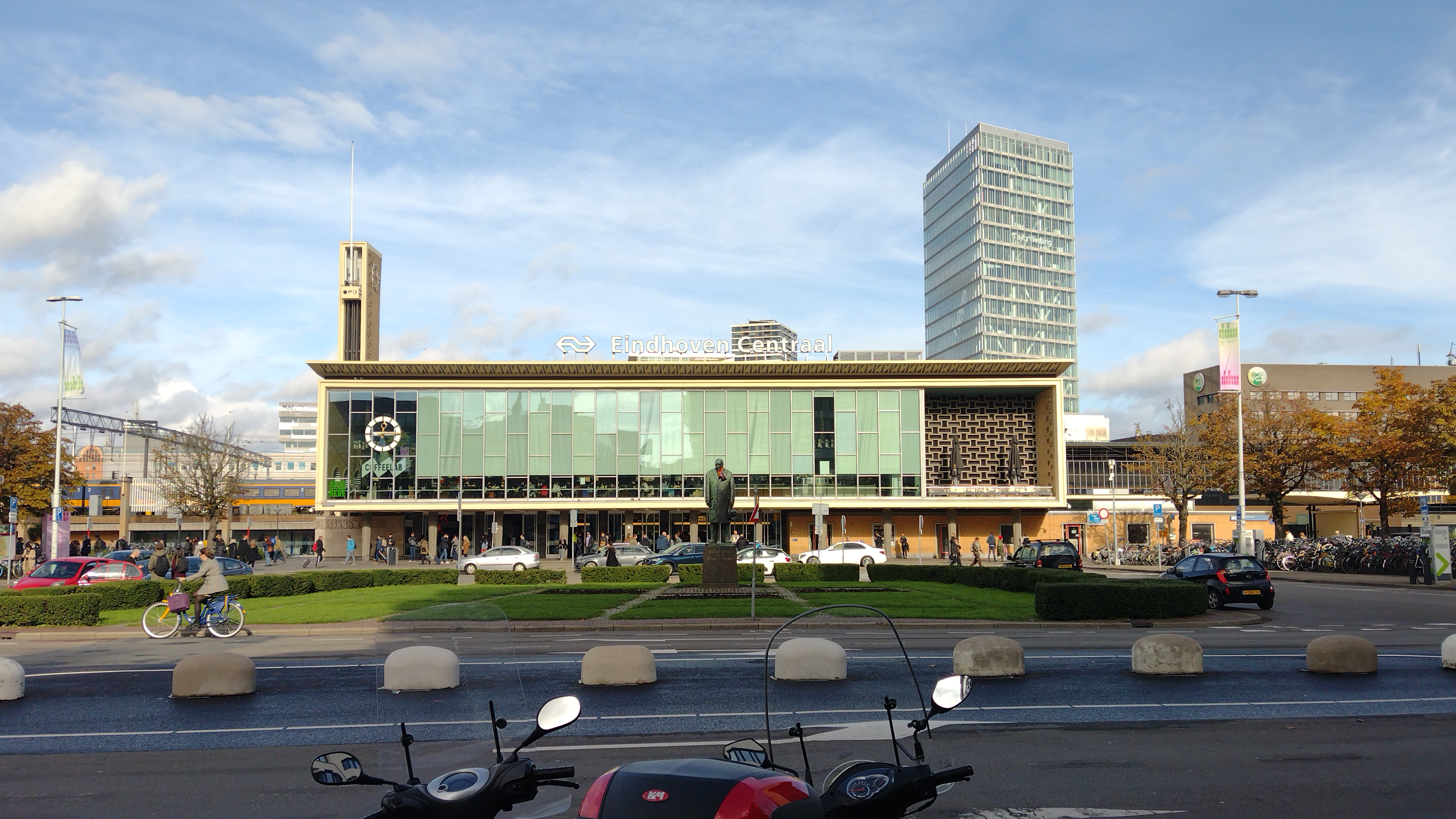
Eindhoven Central Station

=== Rail traffic ===
Eindhoven is a rail transport hub. Eindhoven Centraal railway station is the main station in Eindhoven. It has connections in the directions of:

- Tilburg – Breda – Rotterdam – Delft – The Hague
- 's-Hertogenbosch – Utrecht – Amsterdam – Alkmaar/Enkhuizen
- 's-Hertogenbosch – Utrecht – Amsterdam Zuid – Schiphol Airport
- Helmond – Venlo-(international connections into Germany)
- Weert – Roermond – Sittard – Maastricht/Heerlen

Eindhoven Centraal is served by both intercity and local services while the smaller station, Eindhoven Strijp-S is only served by local trains. Towards 's-Hertogenbosch, Utrecht and Amsterdam trains run every ten minutes, on every day of the week. Eindhoven Stadion is a small station that serves Philips Stadion in the event of football matches or other special events at the stadium. It is located 900m west of the main station.

Up until World War II, a train service connected Amsterdam to Liège via Eindhoven and Valkenswaard, but the service was discontinued and the line broken up. Recently, talks have resumed to have a service to Neerpelt, Belgium via Weert.

=== Roads and highways ===
The A2/E25 motorway from Amsterdam to Luxembourg passes Eindhoven to the west and south of the city. The A2 connects to the highway A58 to Tilburg and Breda just north of the city. Just south of Eindhoven, the A2 connects to the A67 / E34 between Antwerp and Duisburg. In 2006, the A50 was completed connecting Eindhoven to Nijmegen and Zwolle.

=== Local public transit ===
The public transport of Eindhoven consists of more than 20 city bus lines, which also serve neighbouring villages such as Veldhoven, Geldrop and Nuenen. Nine of these buslines (400–408) are marketed as high quality public transport and run with 43 electric articulated buses. Three specially built separated busways (HOV1, HOV2 & HOV3) are used by lines 400 to 408 as well as other city and regional lines. Line 401 to the airport runs almost completely on separated busways. Apart from the city lines there are some 30 regional and rush-hour lines.

=== Bicycle infrastructure ===
Akin to all large Dutch cities, Eindhoven has an extensive network of bicycle paths. Since 2012, the Eindhoven bicycle path network has incorporated the Hovenring.

== Medical care ==
Eindhoven has two hospitals in three locations: the Catharina Hospital and the Máxima Medisch Centrum, which has a branch in Woensel-Zuid (the old Diaconessenhuis) and one in Veldhoven (the old Sint Joseph Hospital). These three have an extensive cooperation and have divided specialties among each other. Emergency medicine, for example, is concentrated in the MMC Veldhoven branch and the Catharina Hospital, the MMC Eindhoven branch has no emergency department. Cardiac procedures are done in the Catharina.

Catharina is also an academic and research hospital and participates in a shared research program with Philips Medical, the Eindhoven University of Technology and the Maastricht University into biomedical science, technology and engineering.

== Notable residents ==
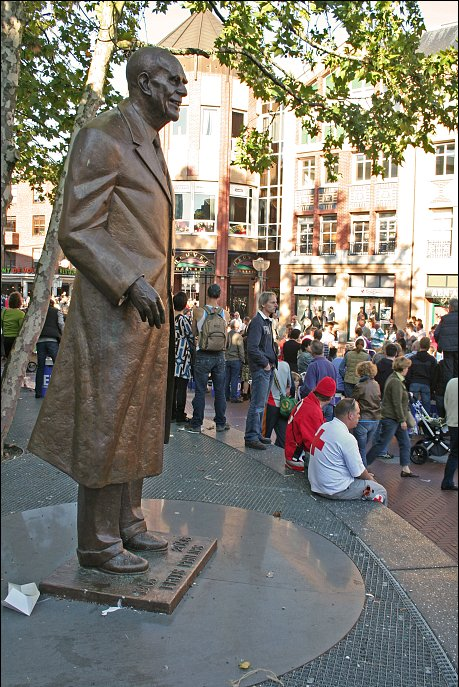
Statue of Frits Philips in Eindhoven

- Kees Bol (1916–2009), painter and art educator
- Jan de Bont (born 1943), film director
- Pieter Celie (1942–2015), artist
- Hugo Brandt Corstius (1935–2014), writer
- Rene Daniels (born 1950), painter
- Lonneke Engel (born 1981), fashion model
- Jalila Essaïdi (born 1980), artist and entrepreneur
- Jan van Hooff (1755–1816), statesman
- Nicole van den Hurk (1980–1995), homicide victim
- Ton de Leeuw (born 1941), organizational theorist
- Theo Maassen (born 1966), comedian and actor
- Tom van den Nieuwenhuijzen (born 1982), politician
- Frits Philips (1905–2005), businessman, son of Anton Philips
- Gerard Philips (1858–1942) and Anton Philips (1874–1951), founders of the Philips company
- Bas Rutten (born 1965), MMA sportsman, colour commentator, actor

Music

- Brooks (born 1995), DJ and record producer
- Maddix (DJ) (born 1990), DJ and record producer
- Patrick van Deurzen (born 1964), composer
- Sander van Doorn (born 1979), techno/trance music DJ and producer
- Peter Koelewijn (born 1940), musician and record producer
- Lenny Kuhr (born 1950), singer-songwriter
- Party In Backyard, YouTuber and record producer
- Piet Souer (born 1948), record producer

Sport

- Peter Aerts (born 1970), kickboxer
- Christijan Albers (born 1979), Formula One racing driver
- Imke Bartels (born 1977), equestrian
- Tineke Bartels (born 1951), equestrian
- Arthur Borren (born 1949), field hockey player
- Jan Borren (born 1947), field hockey player and coach
- Phillip Cocu (born 1970), football player
- Coen Dillen (1926–1990), former PSV Eindhoven footballer
- Cody Gakpo (born 1999), football player
- Paul Haarhuis (born 1966), tennis player
- François van Kruijsdijk (1952–2007), medley swimmer
- Patrick Lodewijks (born 1967), football goalkeeper
- Niels Raaijmakers (born 2000), football player
- Rob Reckers (born 1981), (field) hockey player
- Rik Smits (born 1966), basketball player
- Margje Teeuwen (born 1974), field hockey midfielder
- Rick VandenHurk (born 1985), baseball player
- Tisha Volleman (born 1999), artistic gymnast
- Cor Vriend (born 1949), long-distance runner
- Remmert Wielinga (born 1978), professional road bicycle racer
- Robert de Wit (born 1962), decathlete and bobsledder
- Klaas-Erik Zwering (born 1981), swimmer

== Twin towns – sister cities ==
Eindhoven is twinned with:

- Bayeux, France
- Białystok, Poland
- Chinandega, Nicaragua
- Kadoma, Japan
- Minsk, Belarus
- Nanjing, China

== See also ==
- List of cities in the Netherlands by province#North Brabant
- Jewish Eindhoven
- BrabantStad
