= List of law schools in the Netherlands =

== Universities ==
The Netherlands has ten public (i.e. state-funded) universities with a dedicated law faculty (in no particular order):

- University of Amsterdam (UvA)
  - Amsterdam Law School
- Vrije Universiteit Amsterdam (VU Amsterdam)
  - Faculty of Law
- Leiden University
  - Leiden Law School
- Utrecht University (UU)
  - Faculty of Law, Economics and Governance
- Erasmus University Rotterdam (EUR)
  - Erasmus School of Law (ESL)
- Radboud University Nijmegen (RU)
  - Faculty of Law
- Tilburg University (UvT)
  - Tilburg Law School (TLS)
- Maastricht University (UM)
  - Faculty of Law
- University of Groningen (RUG)
  - Faculty of Law
- The Open University (OU)
  - Faculty of Law

Furthermore, The Netherlands has a single private university which offers a legal program:

- Nyenrode Business University

== Universities of applied sciences ==
The Netherlands has thirteen public (i.e. state-funded) universities of applied sciences which offer legal programs (in no particular order):

- Amsterdam University of Applied Sciences (AUAS)
- The Hague University of Applied Sciences (THUAS)
- University of Applied Sciences Leiden
- University of Applied Sciences Utrecht
- Hanze University of Applied Sciences (UAS)
- Fontys University of Applied Sciences
- Avans University of Applied Sciences
- Inholland University of Applied Sciences
- Zuyd University of Applied Sciences
- Saxion University of Applied Sciences
- Windesheim University of Applied Sciences
- HAN University of Applied Sciences
- Stenden University of Applied Sciences

Furthermore, the Netherlands has a single private university of applied sciences which offers a legal program:

- Tio University of Applied Sciences
