= Tongelre =

Borough of Eindhoven, Netherlands

Coordinates: 51°27′N 5°31′E

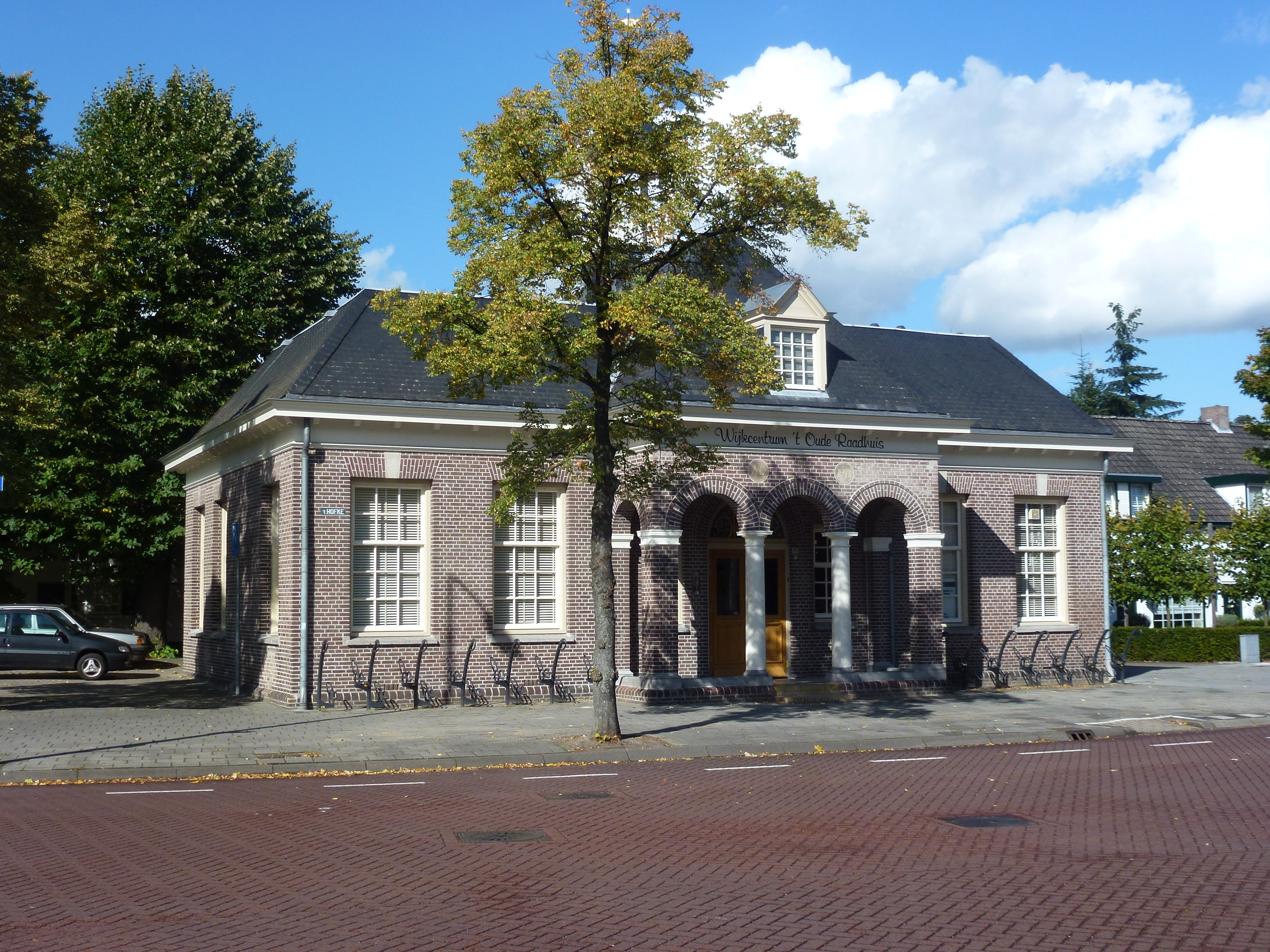
The center of Tongelre Wijkcentrum 't Oud Raadhuis

Tongelre is a borough of Eindhoven. It used to be a separate village to the east of Eindhoven. Waterways comprise most of its borders. It is bordered to the south by a canal, the "Eindhovensch Kanaal" to the borough of Stratum and Geldrop municipality. In the northwest the border with Woensel borough is formed by the river "Dommel" and to the east by the river "Kleine Dommel" (little Dommel) towards Nuenen municipality.

Tongelre was a separate municipality until 1920, when it became part of the municipality of Eindhoven. Today it has nearly 20.000 inhabitants. It is the least urbanised part of Eindhoven.
