= Inkijkmuseum =

Museum in Eindhoven, Netherlands

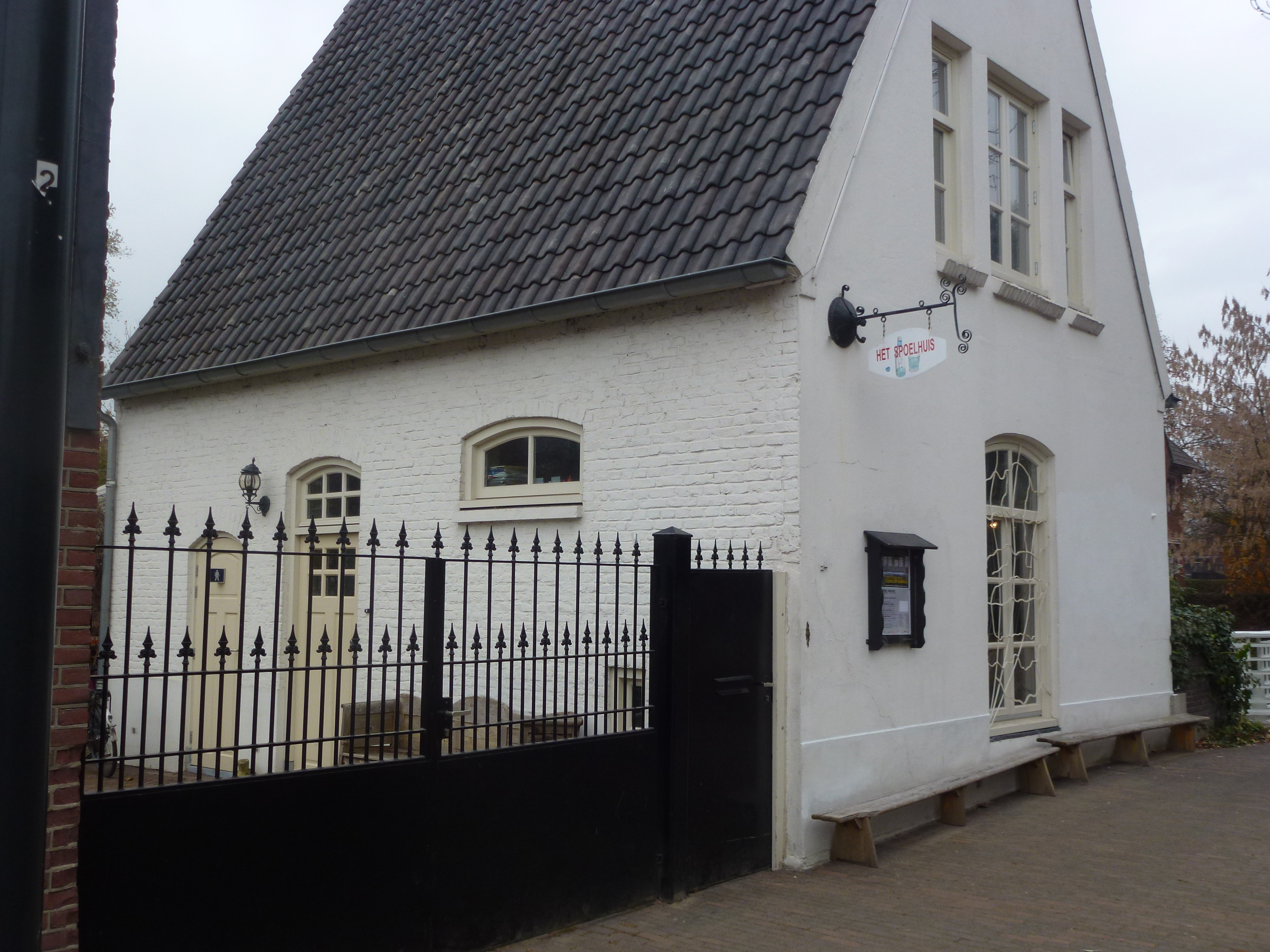
- Location: Netherlands
- Coordinates: 51°26′30″N 5°29′04″E
- Location of Inkijkmuseum

The Inkijkmuseum (lit. trans. Look-in museum) is an originally themed "micro museum" in the Dutch city of Eindhoven. It is located in the washhouse of the former linen factory Van den Briel & Verster on the Dommelstraat.

The original factory was shut down in 1936, after which the washhouse was abandoned for a time. It was then converted into a bicycle parking area for the city police, then into youth center Effenaar and cultural center Cultureel Centrum 2B. It was also in use as private housing at that time.

The ground floor of the building has been in use as the Inkijkmuseum since March 21, 2004. The idea of the "look-in" museum is to host small exhibits which are viewed by the public from outside the building, by looking in through the windows. Such a micro-exhibit might consists of works of art, musical instruments, cultural anthropological artifacts or objects linked to a historical event.

The museum underwent a short renovation in 2008, reopening on October 17.

== Sources ==
https://hikersbay.com/europe/netherlands/eindhoven/museum.html?lang=en
