= Eindhoven Pride =

Annual pride event in Eindhoven, Netherlands

- Status: Active
- Genre: Queer pride, festival
- Frequency: Annually
- Location: Eindhoven
- Country: Netherlands
- Years active: 2023–present
- Inaugurated: June 10, 2023
- Organiser: Queer 040, COC Eindhoven

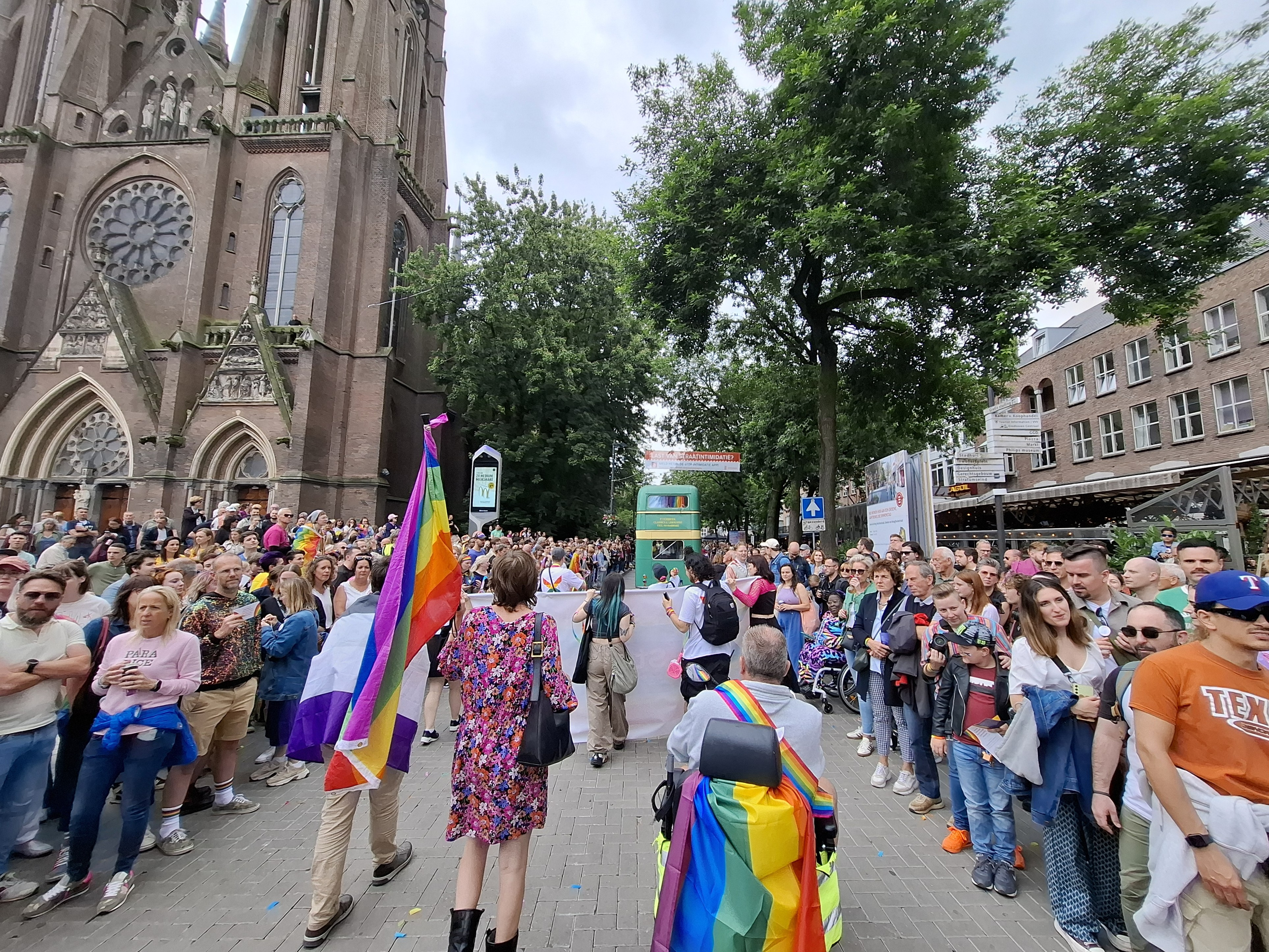
The pride parade in Eindhoven (2024).

Eindhoven Pride is an annual queer pride event in the Dutch city Eindhoven. During the week, the focus is on celebrating diversity and raising awareness for the queer community of Eindhoven. It was held for the first time in Eindhoven in 2023 following a local initiative.

== History ==
In 2022, the local foundation Queer 040 took steps to generate attention for Pride Month in Eindhoven. The local branch of COC Nederland and Queer 040 announced at the New Year's reception of 2023 that they would held a pride walk as part of a series of activities around Pride Month later that year. The pride walk on 10 June attracted around 1500 people. Mayor Jeroen Dijsselbloem revealed on that day also a Rainbow Square in the city.

In the following year, the festivities in Eindhoven were expanded and took place during an entire week. According to the organisation, the Pride Walk attracted over 8,000 people that year.

Pride Eindhoven quickly grew into the fastest-growing pride in the Netherlands. In 2025, 43 different organizations participated in Pride with various events, and Pride Eindhoven received its own flag, among other things. The Pride Parade had a total of 18,000 visitors that year. At the Pride Parade of 2025, an incident occurred in which two men were abused, probably because of their sexual orientation.

In 2026, the organisation introduced a Pride Market and they announced the foundation of a "Pride Fund", with which they want to provide financial support to organisations and makers during Pride Week.
