= Niels Raaijmakers =

Dutch footballer

Personal information
- Date of birth: 16 January 2000 (age 26)
- Place of birth: Eindhoven, Netherlands
- Position: Left-back

Team information
- Current team: PSV Amateurs
- Number: 22

Youth career
- –2009: VV WODAN
- 2009–2013: PSV
- 2013–2016: Willem II
- 2016–2018: FC Eindhoven

Senior career*
Years	Team	Apps	(Gls)
2018–2020	FC Eindhoven	11	(0)
2020–	PSV Amateurs		
- * Club domestic league appearances and goals as of 13 September 2019

Niels Raaijmakers (born 16 January 2000) is a Dutch football player. He plays for PSV Eindhoven Amateurs.

== Club career ==
He made his Eerste Divisie debut for FC Eindhoven on 31 August 2018 in a game against Almere City, as an added-time substitute for Charni Ekangamene.
