= Stratum, Netherlands =

Borough of Eindhoven, Netherlands

Coordinates: 51°25′N 5°29′E

Stratum is a former village in the Dutch province of North Brabant, now one of the seven boroughs of Eindhoven.

Stratum was a separate municipality until 1920, when it became part of Eindhoven. It was centered on the south gate of Eindhoven, before the industrial age. Most of Stratum's neighbourhoods were built between 1920 and 1950.
