= Biomedical technology =

Biomedical technology is the application of engineering and technology principles to the domain of living or biological systems, with an emphasis on human health and diseases.

Biomedical engineering and Biotechnology alike are often loosely called Biomedical Technology or Bioengineering. The Biomedical technology field is currently growing at a rapid pace. Biomedical news has often been reported on various platforms, including the MediUnite Journal; and required jobs for the industry expect to grow 23% by 2024, and with the pay averaging over $86,000.

Biomedical technology involves:

- Biomedical science
- Biomedical informatics
- Biomedical research
- Biomedical engineering
- Bioengineering
- Biotechnology

Biomedical technologies:

- Cloning
  - Therapeutic cloning
