= Tio Business School =

University in the Netherlands

- Tio Business School
- Motto: Smart start • Practical learning • Bright future
- Type: Private Business School
- Established: 1969
- Founder: Mr D. F. J. Wilmink
- Parent institution: Salta Group
- Accreditation: by NVAO
- Director: Frans van Kreuningen
- Total staff: 400
- Students: 2,000
- Other students: 25% international
- Location: Amsterdam*, Utrecht*, Rotterdam*, Eindhoven*, Hengelo, Groningen, The Netherlands; 52.38718°N 4.84080°E
- Campus: *4 International, 6 in total
- Colors: Blue, White, Orange and Green
- Website: https://www.tio.nl/en/
- Location of Tio campus in Amsterdam

Tio Business School is a private Dutch educational institution, founded by the business community in 1969. Tio is a private school that is nationally organised and yet local with six campuses in total out of which four are international: Amsterdam (international), Rotterdam (international), Eindhoven (international), Utrecht (international), Hengelo and Groningen.

Tio offers recognised and accredited full-degree English-taught programmes at associate, bachelor and master level (Higher education) and MBO-4 (Vocational education) in the fields of business & entrepreneurship, hospitality & events, marketing & communications, and real estate brokerage & spacial development (only in Dutch).

Tio Business School has five programmes listed in the Higher Education Guide 2026, all of which are ranked number one. The institution has also been awarded the title “Excellent in its field”. The Higher Education Guide describes how students are very satisfied with the education and how student performance is above average.

QS Stars has awarded Tio Business School no less than 4 stars. On individual components, Tio has shown top performance in various areas such as 5-star rating for Teaching, Global Engagement and Employability followed by 4-star rating for Facilities and Good Governance.

== History ==
Tio has been established in 1969 by VVV-Director D.J.F. Wilmink on behalf of the business community in order to fulfill the need for educated people in the hospitality and tourism industry.

In the early 70's tourism flourished explosively, but there was a lack of the right education and schools. Corporate responded by founding three institutions; Tio Business School, the AVR vocational school and the AVV vocational school. These trade schools were popular due to their short and focused programs which matched the needs of future employers. When the Dutch government stopped subsidizing these schools in the late 1980s, Tio proceeded as a private institution.

=== Duthler acquisition ===
In the early 1990s Tio was experiencing a decrease in new student enrollments and around this period father and son Duthler took over the institution. This decrease was a result of the previous director who abolished the free public transport provisions that Tio students had been able to make use of. After the acquisition a restart followed and changes were implemented.

In 1993 and 1994 Tio took over the AVV vocational school and the AVR vocational school and in 1997, Tunon, a former hospitality school, was also acquired by Tio. From 1991 until 2020 Mark Duthler was the director of Tio, to be followed up by Katinka Reuling in 2020.

=== Salta Group acquisition ===
In 2020, Tio was acquired by the NCOI Group, which is now known as Salta Group. The acquisition was approved by the Netherlands Authority for Consumers and Markets (ACM) in May 2020. According to the ACM, the two institutions largely served different segments of the education market: Tio primarily provided full-time programmes to students under the age of 25, whereas NCOI predominantly offered part-time programmes to students over the age of 25. Currently, the head office of Tio Business School is located in the city of Hilversum in the Netherlands.

The Managing Director since 2024 has been Frans van Kreuningen.

== Programmes ==
Tio Business School offers a range of different programmes for Dutch- as well as English-speaking students:

- MBO-4 (vocational; only in Dutch)
- Associate degree (in English & Dutch)
- Bachelor's degree (in English & Dutch)
- Master's degree (in English & Dutch)

The institution also offers pathway programmes:

- International Foundation Programme
- Pre-master's programme

=== MBO-4 degree (Vocational education; only in Dutch) ===
- Beroepshavo
- Commercieel Business Management
- Eventmanagement en Entertainment
- Horeca en Hotelmanagement
- Makelaardij en Business
- Marketing en Communicatie

The MBO degree take 1 to 2 years to complete, depending on the prerequisites of the student. MBO-4 is an intermediate vocational level in the Dutch education system, the focus is on practical skills in the field of education.

=== Associate degrees ===
Since 2020, the higher education programmes are also offered as a two-year Associate degree fully in English and in Dutch. This is a degree level between MBO-4 (vocational degree) and bachelor's degree.

- Commerce Economics and Entrepreneurship
- Hotel and Event Management
- International Tourism Management
- International Business Management
- Makelaardij and Vastgoed (only in Dutch)

=== Bachelor's degrees ===
- Hotel and Event Management (Bachelor of Arts, BA)
- International Tourism Management (Bachelor of Arts, BA)
- International Business Management (Bachelor of Business Administration, BBA)
- Business Management (Bachelor of Science, BSc)
- Commerce Economics and Entrepreneurship (Bachelor of Science, BSc)
- Creative Business (Bachelor of Arts, BA)
- Communicatie (Bachelor of Arts, BA; only in Dutch)
- Makelaardij en Vastgoed (Bachelor of Science, BSc; only in Dutch)

At most applied sciences universities in the Netherlands, it can take at least four years to obtain your bachelor’s degree, however at Tio students have the opportunity to earn it in just three years. After completing the programme students may use the internationally acknowledged title Bachelor of Arts (BA), Business of Administration (BBA) or Bachelor of Science (BSc).

=== Master of Business Administration (MBA) ===
Since 2021, Tio also offers an MBA programme with seven unique specialisations. This master's degree takes 1 year to complete after completing a bachelor programme, and no working experience or GMAT/GRE is required. The programme consists of modules during which students can deepen and broaden their knowledge and skills to run an organisation successfully.

This Master of Business Administration (professional master, ISAT-code 70124) has been accredited by the NVAO and educates students in one year for the internationally recognised title of Master of Business Administration (MBA).

MBA students can specialise in:

- Commercial Management
- Data Strategy & Business Intelligence
- Entrepreneurship
- Global Leadership & Intercultural Management
- Hospitality Management
- Real Estate Management
- MBA Internship

Tio also offers a 2-year part-time MBA, suitable only for EU/EEA residents that work and live already in the Netherlands or near the border (e.g., in Belgium or Germany).

== Locations ==
Tio Business School has six campuses in the Netherlands. The headquarters, including the central student administration, education development and quality monitoring, admissions and visa teams, marketing and HR, are located in Hilversum. Each of the campuses across the Nethelrands are centrally located near a train station. Therefore, easily accessible via public transport.

== International ==
Tio has an international character and therefore has ties to universities, colleges and companies worldwide for internships and exchange programs.

== Student Association Cognatio ==
Student Association L.S.V. Cognatio has been founded in 2005 and is associated to Tio Business School. It currently has over 900 active members.

== See also ==
- Education in the Netherlands
