= Social design =

Design taking a social perspective

Social design is the application of design methodologies in order to tackle complex human issues, placing the social issues as the priority. Historically social design has been mindful of the designer's role and responsibility in society, and of the use of design processes to bring about social change.

For good or bad, all design is social. There is a prevailing tendency to think of the ‘social’ as something that exists separate from materiality as if it is a force hovering in the ether. We speak of social problems, social good, or social decline as phenomena that are unconditionally human, negotiated, and enacted between individuals with unlimited agency. Material-oriented thinkers such as Bruno Latour, Jane Bennett, and Tim Ingold have sought to dissolve this distinction of the social from the material. They emphasise that things matter, as they are fundamental parts of the intricate and inseparable connections, webs, meshes, or networks of human-material relations. Remarkably, this mentality of seeing the social and material as distinctly separate, as if existing on different plains, also permeates in the practice of design—despite its material media. Design often treats material as exogenous to a social context, an exotic appendage, or a foreign object being introduced into a non-material milieu. This may be the result of a deep desire to elevate human affairs above that of materiality or simply from a fear of acknowledging the overwhelmingly complex set of socio-material relations in which design is embedded, and which constitutes our world.

== History ==
Social design—design for society and with society—is not a modern invention. And yet, it is of such great relevance today, because the global growth economy and its consequences for people and the environment are putting many societies at risk, or are even pushing them to the limits of their capacity to survive. Those who are not yet in this situation are justifiably concerned about the future. It is becoming increasingly clear that the imbalance of resources, means of production, education, and future prospects is a significant part of the problem. Thus, as in earlier times of crisis—in contrast to growing tendencies toward nationalism and isolationism—there is much discussion today about developing an open and cosmopolitan social culture, and redesigning social systems and working and living conditions in a way that bears in mind their implications for the world as a whole.

Architects, designers, craftspeople, and engineers have always played a decisive role in shaping such a social culture. Their visions for a better and more livable world have driven and continue to drive their own work and their sphere of influence, and have been a valuable reference for their successors.

The English designer, writer, publisher, and socialist activist William Morris holds a special place in this regard. The pioneer of the Arts and Crafts Movement, with his view that art and society are interconnected, left a lasting mark. He understood his work as an alternative to industrialization and its harmful effects on people and the environment, as had been described, for example, by Friedrich Engels in his 1845 essay The Condition of the Working Class in England. According to Morris, true art should be “made by the people, and for the people, as a happiness to the maker and the user.” Consequently, he himself became a craftsman, designer, and producer of wallpapers, textiles, glass, and furniture, who assumed responsibility for the entire design and production process in his collaborations with other designers. The main principles he applied to his work were beauty, quality, truth to materials, and durability. And he found inspiration in nature as an expression of vibrant growth as well as the craftsmanship of the Middle Ages and the preindustrial era. Morris’s designs marked a stark contrast to the poor quality of the industrially manufactured products of his day and were greatly influential in the evolution of the decorative arts far beyond Great Britain. His ideal of a balanced society based on communal ownership, exchange, and development opportunities for all is described in his 1890 utopian novel News from Nowhere. Although he attempted to draw closer to his vision through a number of initiatives, his artisanal and social commitments harbor an irreconcilable contradiction: the painstakingly handcrafted products were affordable only to a wealthy circle of art enthusiasts and thus inaccessible to the parts of society he intended to reach.

Within the design world, social design is defined as a design process that contributes to improving human well-being and livelihood.

Social design in 20th century has been inspired by Victor Papanek's writings, he was one of the first to address issues of social design in the 1960s. He was focused on creating change within the design field and no longer tolerating misdesign, any design that does not account for the needs of all people and disregards its own environmental consequences. To be a positive force in society, design and designers need to be socially and morally responsible, designers carry a serious responsibility for the consequences their designs have on society. These consequences include environmental impact and designers can contribute to designing more considerate and ecological products by carefully selecting the materials they use. Papanek also remarks on designing for people's needs (rather than their wants) and designers have responsibility over the choices they make in design processes. Often design is detached from the real world and is focused on the commercial market by designing for luxury items or for just a few people based on aesthetics, or disposable items. Papanek emphasizes designers should have a keen eye for where the need is and often that is found by looking at marginalized populations.

Another author who contributes to the development of social design is Victor Margolin. He writes in the 2002 book, The Politics of the Artificial: Essays on Design and Design Studies the "designer's ability to envision and give form on material and immaterial products that can address human problems on broad scale and contribute to social well-being." This ideology is something that social design is built on. In this view social design is an activity that should not be framed with connotations of charity, aid donations, help, etc. It is not voluntary work, but it should be seen as professional contribution that plays a part in local economic development or livelihood. At the same time Social Design also challenges the conventional market model of designing. While traditionally, Design has been approached as a profession that remains strictly answerable to market forces, social design envisages the possibility of a more distributive conception of surpluses, by ensuring that the benefits of services and systems reach a wider range of user groups who may often fall outside the market system. Margolin writes, "The primary purpose of design for the market is creating products for sale. Conversely, the foremost intent of social design is the satisfaction of human needs."

Designer George Aye writes about the importance of acknowledging the role of power when designing for complex social sector issues, as one may do for social design projects. Depending on the project, designing for user engagement in a project can be more important than designing for solutions, and it encourages the use of human-centered design methodologies.

Engineer Chris Cox of Facebook used the term "social design" in 2010 and 2011 as, "[social design] defines the concept as improving how people build human-to-human, versus human-to-interface, connections online".

Outside the design world social design appears in a number of professional environments, there are many artists that use the term social design or social practice to describe their work, though the work is exhibited within the contexts of the art world and have a different dialog when compared to design.

== Models ==
While there is not one "official" set of social design methods, the approaches listed below are well established in both academic and practical circles. They each offer different lenses through which designers can address societal challenges, often leading practitioners to blend methods to best suit their project’s context and objectives.

=== Stanford model of design thinking ===
Stanford University's Hasso Plattner Institute of Design (d school) and IDEO collaboratively created interdisciplinary research in 1991 in order to improve the design process, and from that, Stanford's model of design thinking as a process emerged. The Stanford model has been applied to social design, where the goal is to develop both human and social capital with new products and processes that can be profitable, a goal that the anti-capitalist magazine In These Times called "naïve, at best".

=== Margolin's social model ===
Victor Margolin and Sylvia Margolin wrote in 2002 about the "social model" as a design practice and research methodology, primarily focused on social services but the ideas could be expanded in to educational systems, healthcare systems and for civic technology design. The social model involves a focus on human needs by taking inspiration from core social work literature and has an ecological perspective (that is less commonly seen in modes of design). Margolin suggests a multifaceted approach to solving problems, first accessing the situation by answering a few core questions, followed by survey research and interviews, content analysis of archival data, and/or participant observation.

=== IDEO model ===
The design firm, IDEO defines social design as a process that encourages community facilitation including the sharing of conversation and ideas, beliefs and rituals. The process should be supportive and empowering for those involved and offer an innovative and feasible process. The designer(s) should not try to change people's behavior and they draws on the differences in cultural traditions and cultural beliefs in order to frame the problems within society. Additionally there is importance of the wider influence including the environmental awareness of the design, since the environment effects everyone and is interconnected.

=== The New Materialist Model ===
This model seeks to break down any distinction between design and society. Boelen and Kaethler argue that all design is, for good or bad, essentially social because it is produced by, and exists in, the social realm. They observe, "A [new] materialist reading of social design on one hand complexifies the design process and on the other offers insight into meaningful forms of engagement." It employs central themes developed by thinkers such as Jane Bennet, Tim Ingold and Bruno Latour and as a result it produces design that rejects the logic of solutionism and tends towards research, personal reflection and story-telling—such as auto-ethnographic design. It is critiqued for being 'naval gazing' and too closely resembling artist practice and production.

== Initiatives ==
- Hasso Plattner Institute of Design at Stanford University has supported social design programs.
- The Archeworks school was founded in 1994 and is located in Chicago, they were early in teaching socially responsible design processes.
- Curry Stone Design Prize, 2008—2017, a prize focused on design innovation in the social sector.
- Measured Summit, Design+Health in New York City was founded in 2017, a social design conference centered around the health care industry.
- The World Design Research Initiative, aka Worldesign, at the University of Art and Design Helsinki. Worldesign aims to explore issues relevant to social, welfare, and responsible design and to generate theory, as well as applicable systems or models. Its members produce exhibitions, workshops, and publications, which work as tools for testing and evaluating different social design applications.
- The University of Technology Sydney introduced a Bachelor of Creative Intelligence & Innovation degree in 2014, which must be completed in combination with another undergraduate degree. With a strong focus on developing novel solutions for social issues, it enables students "to participate in a future-facing, world-first, transdisciplinary degree that takes multiple perspectives from diverse fields, integrating a range of industry experiences, real-world projects and self-initiated proposals – equipping students to address the complex challenges and untapped opportunities of our times."
- In Spain, the Diseño Social EN+ launched in 2011.
- The Design Academy Eindhoven was one of the first European Masters in Social Design, initiated by Jan Boelen. They employ a New Materialist approach to social design.

== See also ==
- Business ethics
- Conceptual design
- Public interest design – design practice towards the greater good
- Service design – an ecological approach to designing a service.
- Social change – about changing social norms, behaviors
- Sociotechnical system – an approach to complex organizational work design that recognizes the interaction between people and technology in workplaces.
- Social responsibility – an ethical theory
- Sustainable design – philosophy of designing physical objects, the built environment, and services to comply with the principles of ecological sustainability.
- Universal design – the design of buildings, products or environments to make them accessible to all people, regardless of age, disability or other factors.
