= Henri Bol =

Dutch painter

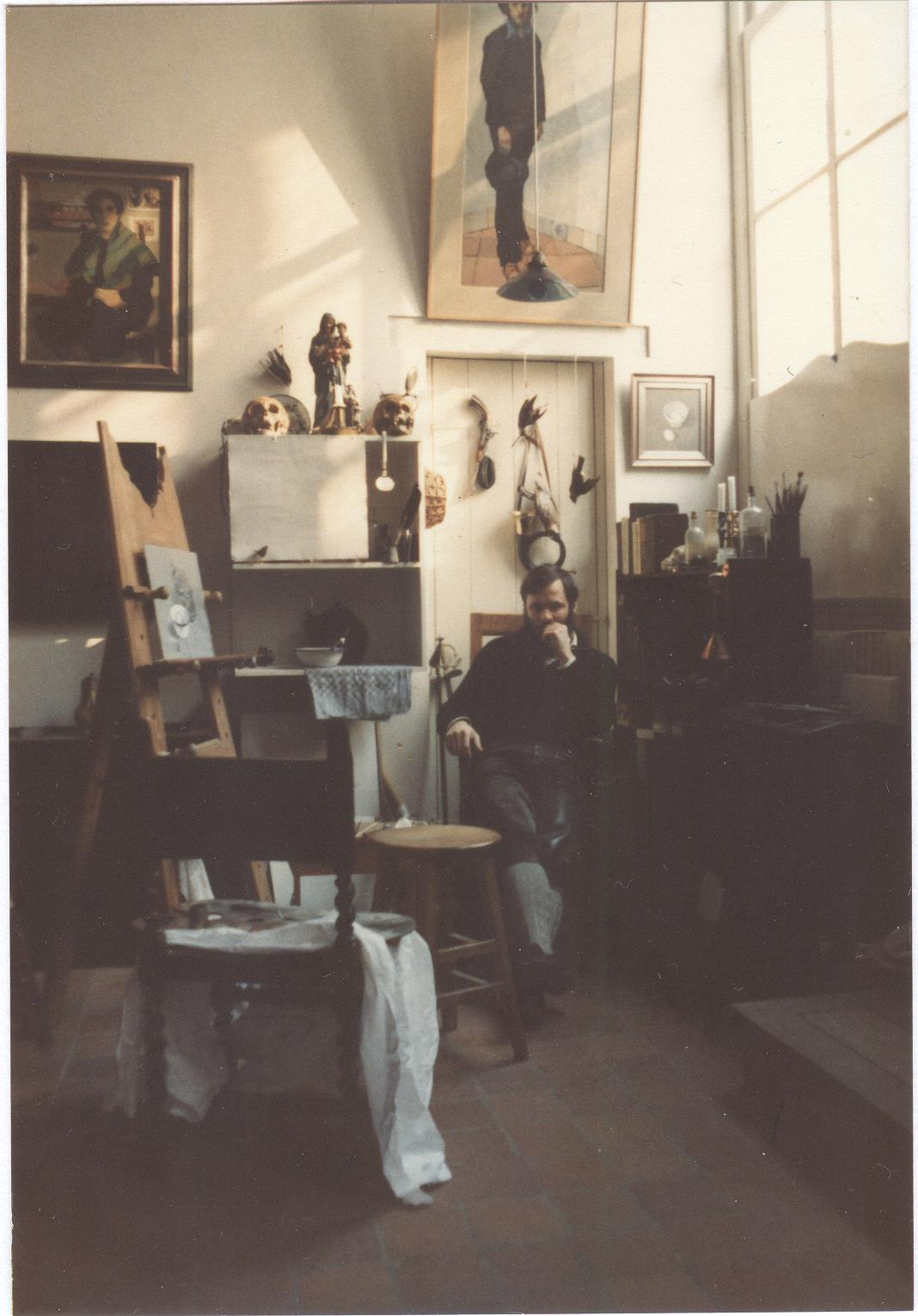
- Born: Henri Cornelis Bol; 10 January 1945; Eindhoven, Netherlands
- Died: 10 July 2000 (aged 55) 's-Hertogenbosch, Netherlands
- Known for: Painting

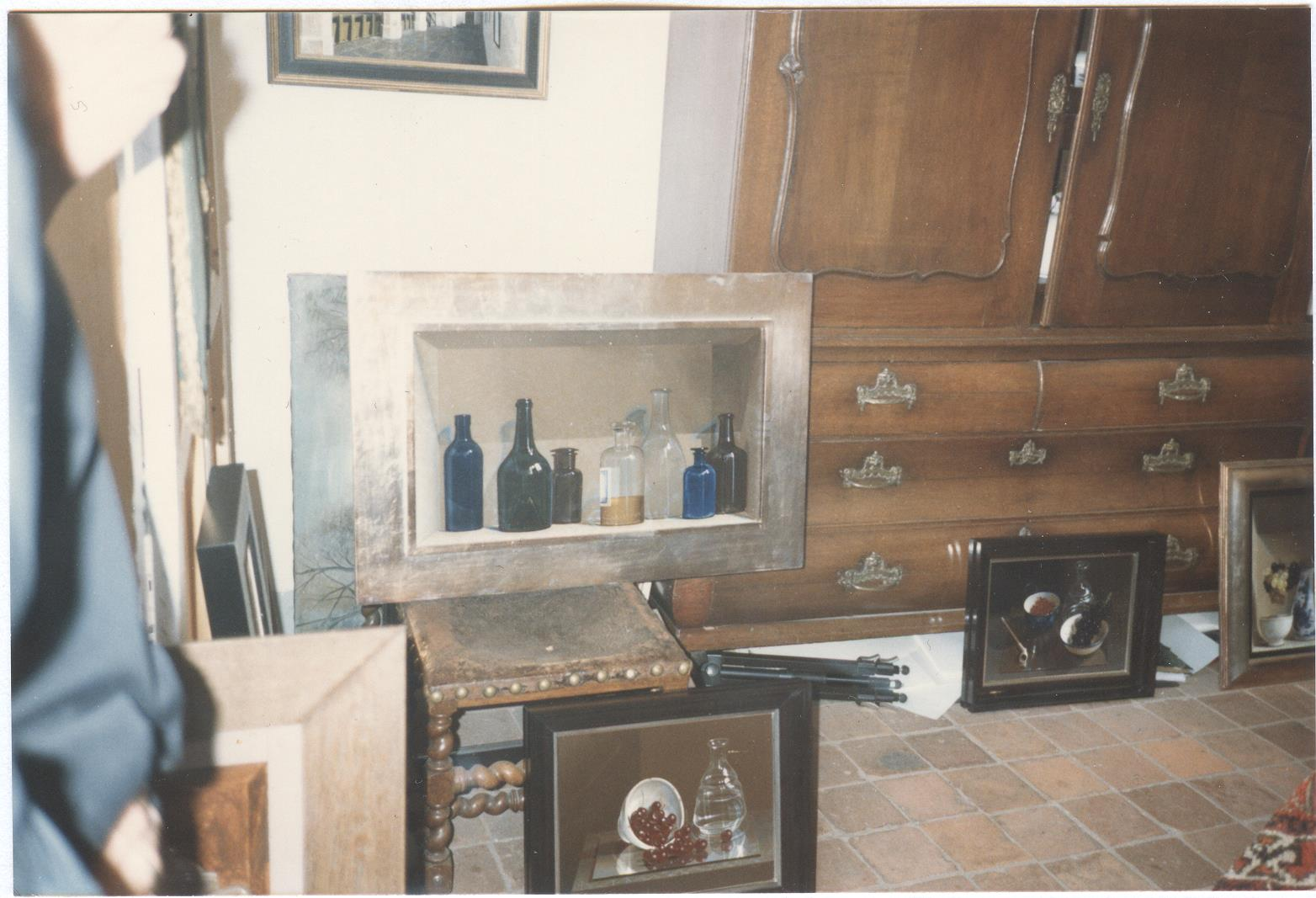
Works by Henri Bol

Henri Cornelis Bol (10 January 1945 – 10 July 2000) was a Dutch still life painter, whose work was noted for its realism and trompe-l'œil technique.

== Life and career ==
Bol was born and raised in Eindhoven as the eldest son of painter Kees Bol. As a young adult he studied at the Design Academy Eindhoven (1960-1964), where his father was a teacher, and for several years, he also attended the Graphic School in Eindhoven. He also trained at the Technical College in Roermond where he was taught printing.

In September 1966, he met Gerrie Klinkenberg, eldest daughter of a police inspector. They were married in April 1968. In the autumn of 1967 he applied successfully for a job as a creative therapist at the hospital for mental health Huize Padua in Boekel. The family lived in Handel. In 1972, the "Blaauw Laaken", a Grade I listed house build in 1604, was acquired in the old fortified town of Heusden.

In the late sixties Bol visited the Museum Arnhem, and became fascinated by Dutch painters Raoul Hynckes, Dick Ket, Pyke Koch and Carel Willink. The paintings made by these artists inspired him to focus seriously on painting. Soon Bol was given the opportunity to exhibit his work. With fellow artists, he showed his paintings at Gemert Castle and at the Old Mill in Thorn. In 1973, Bol exhibited his work at the Town Hall of Hilvarenbeek.

An avid collector, he acquired antiques like furniture, pewter, enamel, (pocket)watches, musical instruments, glassware, china and books. Historical objects which served only one purpose, namely to act as subjects in his still lifes. Bol was fascinated by their history and beauty.

In the late 1970s, Bol exhibited in the Old Town Hall of Beek en Donk and at the Philips Leisure Centre in Eindhoven. Subsequently, he showed his work at Smelik & Stokking Galleries in The Hague, Gallery Mokum in Amsterdam and Gallery Gogol in Düsseldorf, Germany. In 1988, his wife Gerrie Bol-Klinkenberg launched her own Art Gallery "Blaauw Laaken" where Bol exhibited his paintings with great success until he died in 2000.

In the mid-1990s, RTL Nederland aired 'Toppers', a series of documentaries featuring Dutch celebrities, presented by Willibrord Frequin. Central in one episode was Frits Philips, of the Philips Electronics company. Bol featured in this program because he was working on a still life, commissioned in honour of the 90th birthday of the industrialist.

In 2002, on the occasion of the publication of a monograph on his work, an exhibition was organized at the Museum Kempenland in Eindhoven, titled "Sophisticated and timeless, still lifes by Henri Bol (1945-2000)".

In 2022, Henri Bol will be the subject of 2 exhibitions in Heusden. Museum Het Gouverneurshuis will focus on Bol's artistic upbringing in Eindhoven, how the town Heusden inspired his work, and it will celebrate his success as an artist. In Het Blaauw Laaken Kunstkabinet a selection of still life paintings by Henri Bol will be on display. It will give a good overview of the development Bol made as an artist. His paintings will also be placed in the context of the artists who inspired him and with whom he felt connected. A new book on the artist, Henri Bol. De leefwereld van een Brabantse fijnschilder, is also published. The exhibition was officially opened on 22 April 2022 by the King's Commissioner of North Brabant Mrs Ina Adema.

In 2025, Henri Bol would have turned eighty. It also marks 25 years since his passing—a fitting moment to commemorate the life and work of this fine artist through an exhibition and publication. This tribute takes shape through the work of his father, the painter Kees Bol. Central to the exhibition are the portraits Kees Bol painted of his eldest son Henri. On Friday, September 19, Mr. Jeroen van den Bosch, Alderman for Culture and Art of the municipality of Heusden, officially opened the exhibition 'Kees Bol Portretten van Henri' at art gallery Het Blaauw Laaken Kunstkabinet in Heusden. Following the opening, author Willemijn Bol presented him with the first copy of the book 'Kees Bol – Portretten van Henri'.

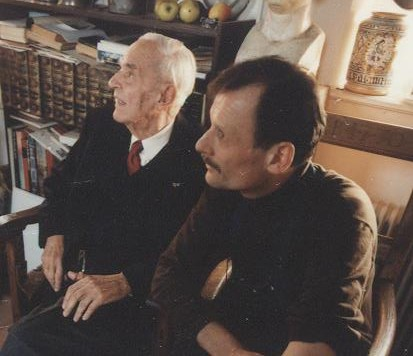
Frits Philips with artist Henri Bol

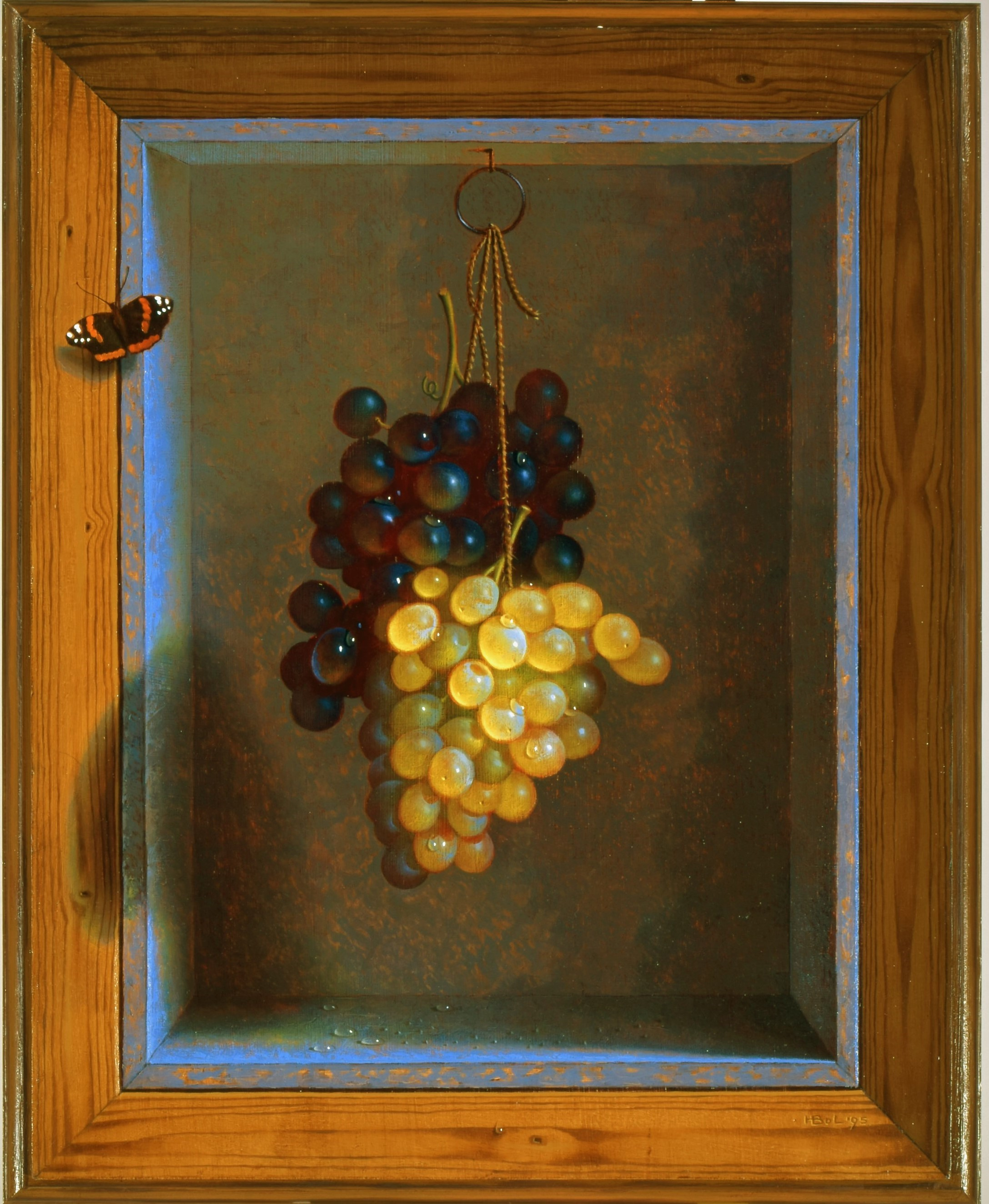
Henri Bol, Stilllife with grapes, 1995

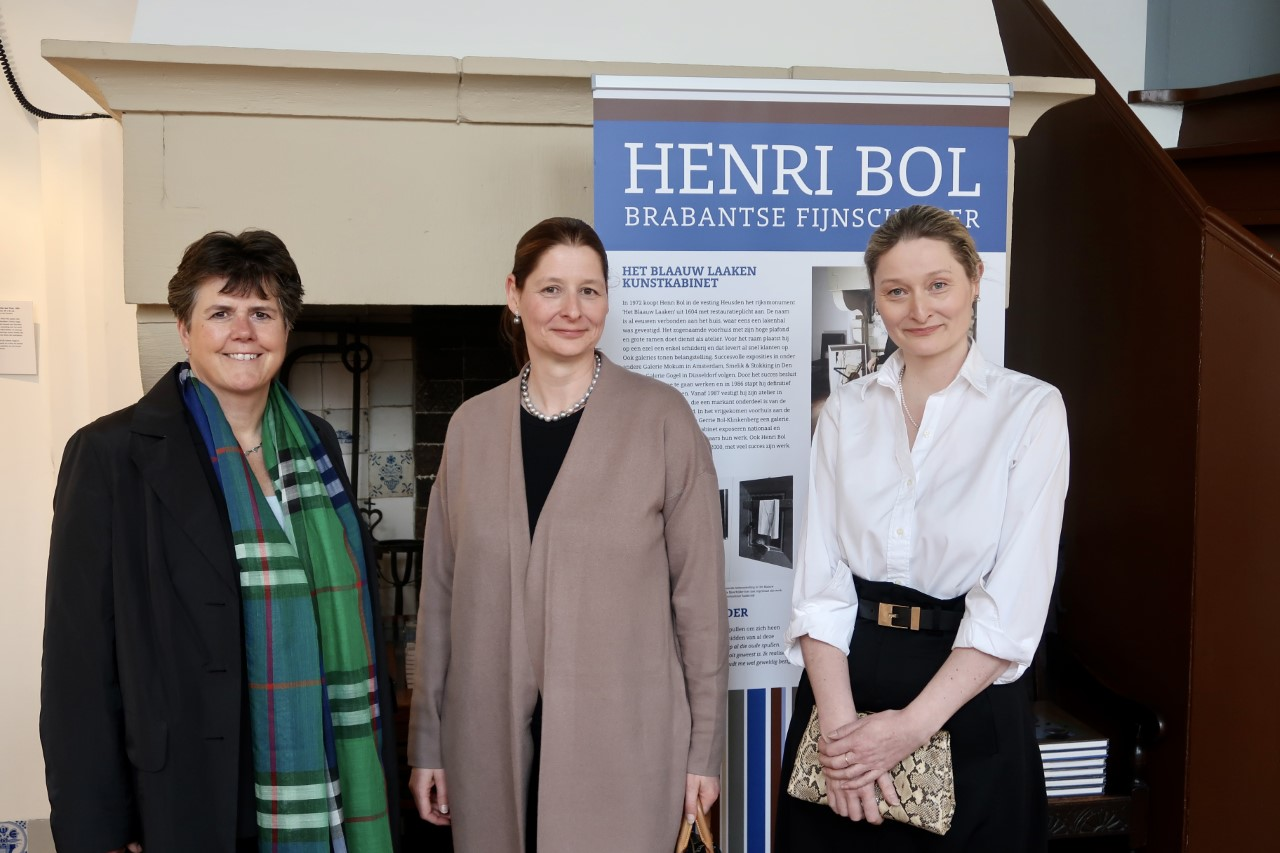
Opening exhibition 'Henri Bol', in art gallery Het Blaauw Laaken Kunstkabinet Heusden 2022. From left to right, the King's Commissioner of North Brabant Ina Adema, Charlotte Bol en Willemijn Bol

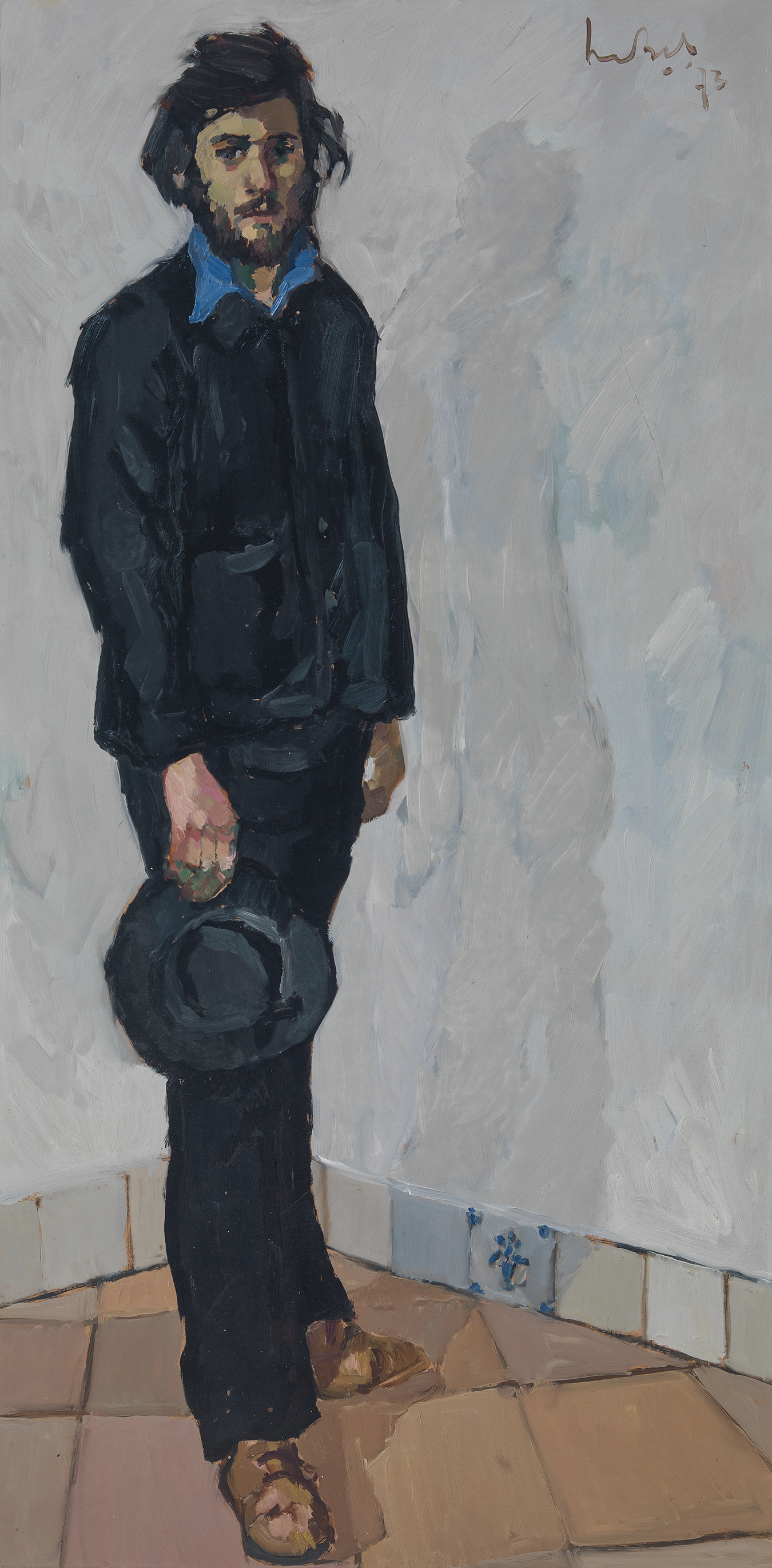
Portrait of Henri Bol, painted by his father Kees Bol

== Bibliography ==
- Thoben, Peter, Verstilde Stillevens, Museum Kempenland Eindhoven, Eindhoven 2004. pp. 76, 88. ISBN 9072478797 (in Dutch language)
- Schoonen, Rob, Een perfecte fijnschilder, Eindhovens Dagblad 21 February 2002. pp. 33. (in Dutch language)
- Eeden, Hans van den, Expositie als monument voor Henri Bol, Brabants Dagblad 21 January 2002. pp 9. (in Dutch language)
- Bodt, Saskia de, Aalst, Tom van der en Bol, Peter, Henri Bol 1945-2000, uitg. Pictures Publishers, Wijk en Aalburg 2001. ISBN 9073187400 (in Dutch language)
- Art Fair Autotron in Rosmalen, Origine 6 1998. pp. 102–104 (in Dutch language)
- Verburgh, Henriette, Stilleven als eeuwig leven: Henri Bol in Heusdens Kunstkabinet Het Blaauw Laaken, Origine 5 1997. pp 64–65. (in Dutch language)
- Aalst, Tom van der, Heusden en Altena, In de ban van het water, uitg. Pictures Publishers, Wijk en Aalburg 1996. pp 94–95. ISBN 9073187249 (in English and Dutch language)
- Hamming, Annelette, Henri Bol en het Stilleven, Tableau 3 1994. pp 82–84. (in Dutch language)
- Vader en zoon, een wereld van verschil, gezamenlijke expositie van Kees en Henri Bol, Palet 246 1993. pp 30–35. (in Dutch language)
- Jacobs, P.M.J., Beeldend Nederland, uitg. drs. P.M.J.Jacobs BV Tilburg 1993.(in Dutch language)
- Scholten-Klinkenbergh, Monique, Twee generaties. Kees en Henri Bol, landschappen en stillevens, Smelik & Stokking Galleries Den Haag 1988.(in Dutch language)
- Visser, Sjouke, 20 realisten; hedendaagse kunst uit Nederland, uitg. Galerie de Vis, Harlingen 1987. (in Dutch language)
- Bol, Henri, Hofmeester, Frans en Lossie, Frans, Fijnschilderen. Het stilleven volgens de werkwijze van Henri Bol, uitg. Cantecleer 1985. ISBN 9789021302461 (in Dutch language)
- Bol, Willemijn, Van Engen, Hildo, Thoben, Peter, Henri Bol. De leefwereld van een Brabantse fijnschilder, uitg. Het Gouverneurshuis, Heusden, Het Blaauw Laaken Kunstkabinet, Heusden, 2022. ISBN 9789090360287 (in Dutch language)
- Bol, Willemijn, Kees Bol Portretten van Henri, uitg. Het Blaauw Laaken Kunstkabinet, Heusden, 2025. ISBN 9789090408873 (in Dutch language)
- Van Eck, Mieske, De echo van schedeltjes of een dood vogeltje ontroerde de Heusdense fijnschilder Henri Bol, Brabants Dagblad 16 April 2022. pp 13. (in Dutch language)
- Van den Bosch, Peter, Henri Bol, een fijnschilder, Katholiek Nieuwsblad 20 December 1985, pp. 5. (in Dutch language)
- Spaninks, Angelique, 'Ik ben er een van gas terugnemen'. Heusdense fijnschilder Henri Bol viert vijftigste verjaardag met expositie. Brabants Dagblad 17 December 1994. (in Dutch language) https://en.m.wikipedia.org/wiki/Hardcore_Henry
