= Frits Philips =

Dutch businessman (1905–2005)

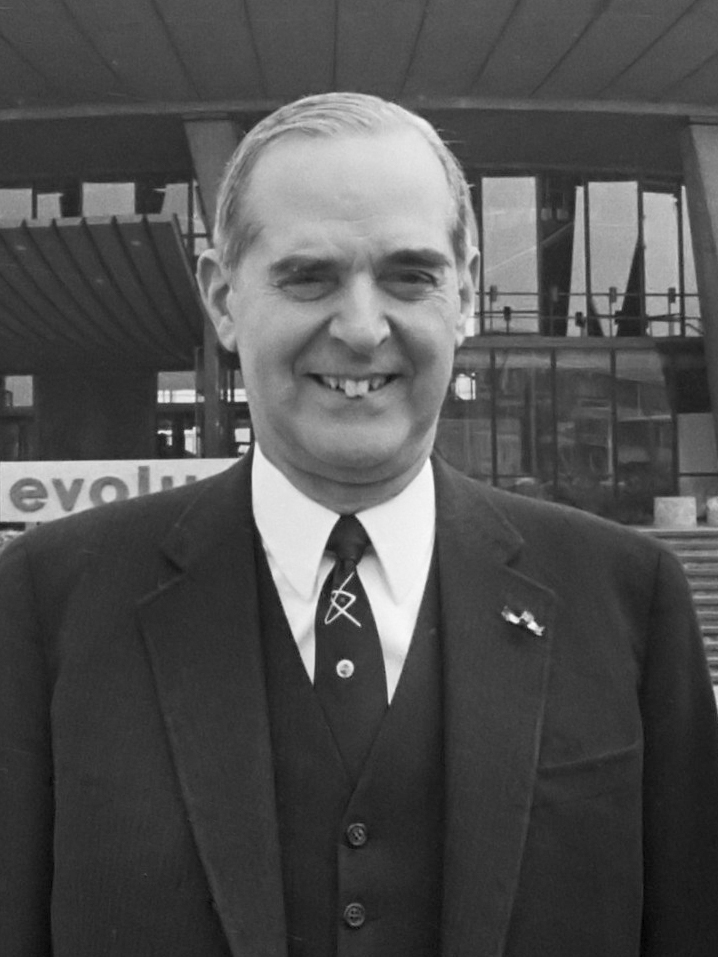
- Philips in 1971
- Born: Frederik Jacques Philips; 16 April 1905; Eindhoven, Netherlands
- Died: 5 December 2005 (aged 100); Eindhoven, Netherlands
- Education: Technische Hogeschool Delft
- Known for: Chairman of the BOD of Philips
- Spouse: Sylvia van Lennep (m. 1929; died 1992)
- Children: 7
- Parent(s): Anton Philips; Anna de Jongh

Frederik Jacques "Frits" Philips (16 April 1905 – 5 December 2005) was a Dutch centenarian who was the fourth chairman of the board of directors of the Dutch electronics company Philips, which his uncle and father founded. For his actions in saving 382 Jews during the Nazi Occupation of the Netherlands in World War II, he was recognised in 1996 by Yad Vashem as a Righteous Among the Nations.

== Early life and education ==
Frits Philips was born in the city of Eindhoven in the south of the Netherlands. The second child, he was the only son of Anton Philips and his wife Anne Henriëtte Elisabeth Maria de Jongh. His father was of Dutch Jewish origin, as well as the co-founder when in 1912 they incorporated the family business. Frits had an older sister named Annetje and a younger sister named Jettie. Their grandfather Frederik Philips was a first cousin of Karl Marx.

In 1923, Philips started his studies at the Delft University of Technology; he received an engineer's degree in mechanical engineering in 1929. He was introduced to the Oxford Group in 1934, the Christian movement that was the forerunner of Moral Re-Armament (MRA) and Initiatives of Change (IofC).

== Marriage and family ==
The Oxford Group was a lifelong source of inspiration to him and his wife. On 4 July 1929 in The Hague, he married Sylvia, Jonkvrouw van Lennep (The Hague, 16 December 1905 – Eindhoven, 29 August 1992), daughter of Jonkheer Roelof van Lennep (Wiesbaden, 3 October 1876 – The Hague, 13 September 1951), and wife Digna Jacoba Mijer (b. Batavia, 28 March 1883). The couple had seven children:

- Digna Hintzen-Philips (14 September 1930 – 7 February 2018, who married Peter Hintzen and has Herman-Frederik and Rein),
- Anton Frederik (Ton) (b. 12 March 1932 who married Johanna Charlotte Daneel and had Frits, Joey and Karel),
- Anne Jetje (Annejet) Campbell-Philips (14 October 1933 – 1 March 2007, who married Paul Campbell and had Edith Anne and Digna),
- Sylvia Dutterloo-Philips (6 December 1936 – 13 June 1988, married to Herbert van Werkhoven and had Sylvia and Harro, later married Anton Dutterloo),
- Warner (Eindhoven, 6 August 1938 – 14 May 2022, who married Cornelia Clara (Nel) de Graaf and had Liz and Maria),
- Frederik (Frits) (b. 10 April 1940, who married Christine Bosschaart and had Christine, Tony, Warner and Annejet, later married Els van Slingelandt) and
- Maria Philips-Moniz (b. 23 April 1947 who married Hans Schouten and had Jan, Marileen and Pieter, later married Allan Moniz and had Mark).

== Career ==
On 18 October 1935, Frits Philips was appointed vice-director and a member of the board of Philips.

Learning of the expected occupation of the Netherlands by Nazi Germany in World War II in 1940, his father Anton Philips, young nephew Frans Otten, and other Philips family members escaped from the Netherlands and fled to the United States, taking company capital with them. Frits Philips stayed in the Netherlands. Together they managed to keep the company alive during the war.

From 30 May until 20 September 1943, Philips was held in the concentration camp Vught because of a strike at the Philips factory. During the Occupation, Philips saved the lives of 382 Jews by convincing the Nazis that they were indispensable for the production process at Philips. In 1996, he was recognized by Yad Vashem as among the Righteous Among the Nations for his actions.

In 1961, Philips succeeded Frans Otten as president of the company. He served in this position for 10 years; in 1971 he was succeeded by Henk van Riemsdijk.

At the age of 100, on 5 December 2005, Philips died from complications resulting from a fall in November.

== Aviation ==
European business aviation emerged with the rebuilding of the continent following the end of Second World War. It was aided, in part, by an appreciation of the recently proven versatility of aviation and the availability of former military aircraft, crew and airfields.

Following the end of hostilities, company executives saw the potential in this adaptable and available means of transport, facilitating visits to production and administration centers quickly. This was the genesis of corporate flight departments. As chairman of one of Europe's burgeoning conglomerates, Philips was amongst the first to establish a flight department with the acquisition of a Beechcraft Super G18 (registered PH-LPS), creating Philips Vliegdienst.

Over the years, the flight department grew to include Dassault Falcons, Fokker F27s, and Beechcraft King Airs. Appreciating the growing importance and potential of corporate aviation, Frits Philips established the International Business Aviation Association (Europe) in 1977. Initially based in Eindhoven and consisting of 12 founding Members, the association grew into the EBAA (European Business Aviation Association), which hosts the annual European Business Aviation Conference and Exhibition (EBACE) in Genève.

Frits Philips' legacy to Dutch aviation was not solely focused on corporate aviation. He was also instrumental in the construction of the civilian Terminal building and Eindhoven Airport.

== Mr. Frits ==
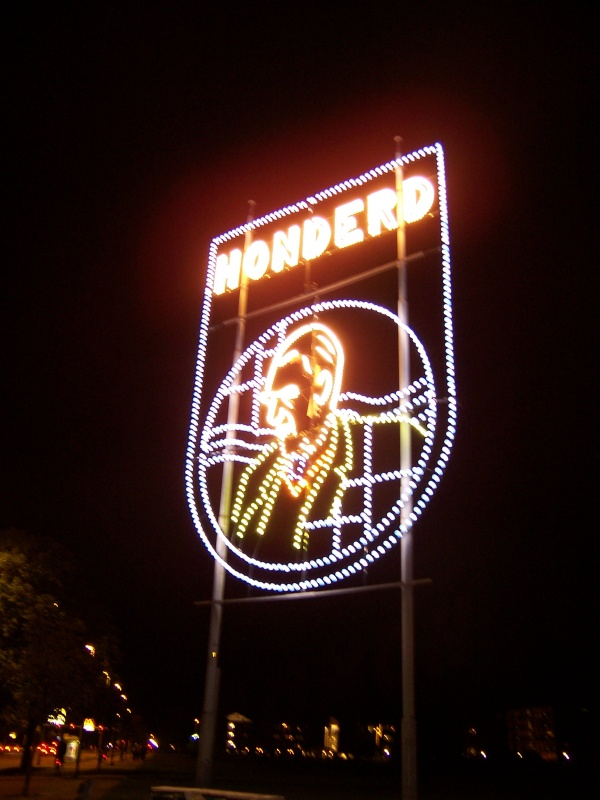
A picture of Frits Philips in the Lichtjesroute of 2005, to celebrate his 100th birthday

Frits Philips was immensely popular in Eindhoven. The citizens of Eindhoven commonly referred to him as "Meneer Frits" (Mister Frits). Frits made no class difference between factory workers and members of the board of directors: he was often seen chatting to the factory workers, which contributed to his popularity.

His hundredth birthday in 2005 was celebrated on a large scale in his home city of Eindhoven, which was renamed Frits Philips Stad (Frits Philips City) for the occasion. The city minted a special coin that bears the nickname "Fritske". The yearly Lichtjesroute event honoured him that year by placing a picture of him highlighted along the route (see image).

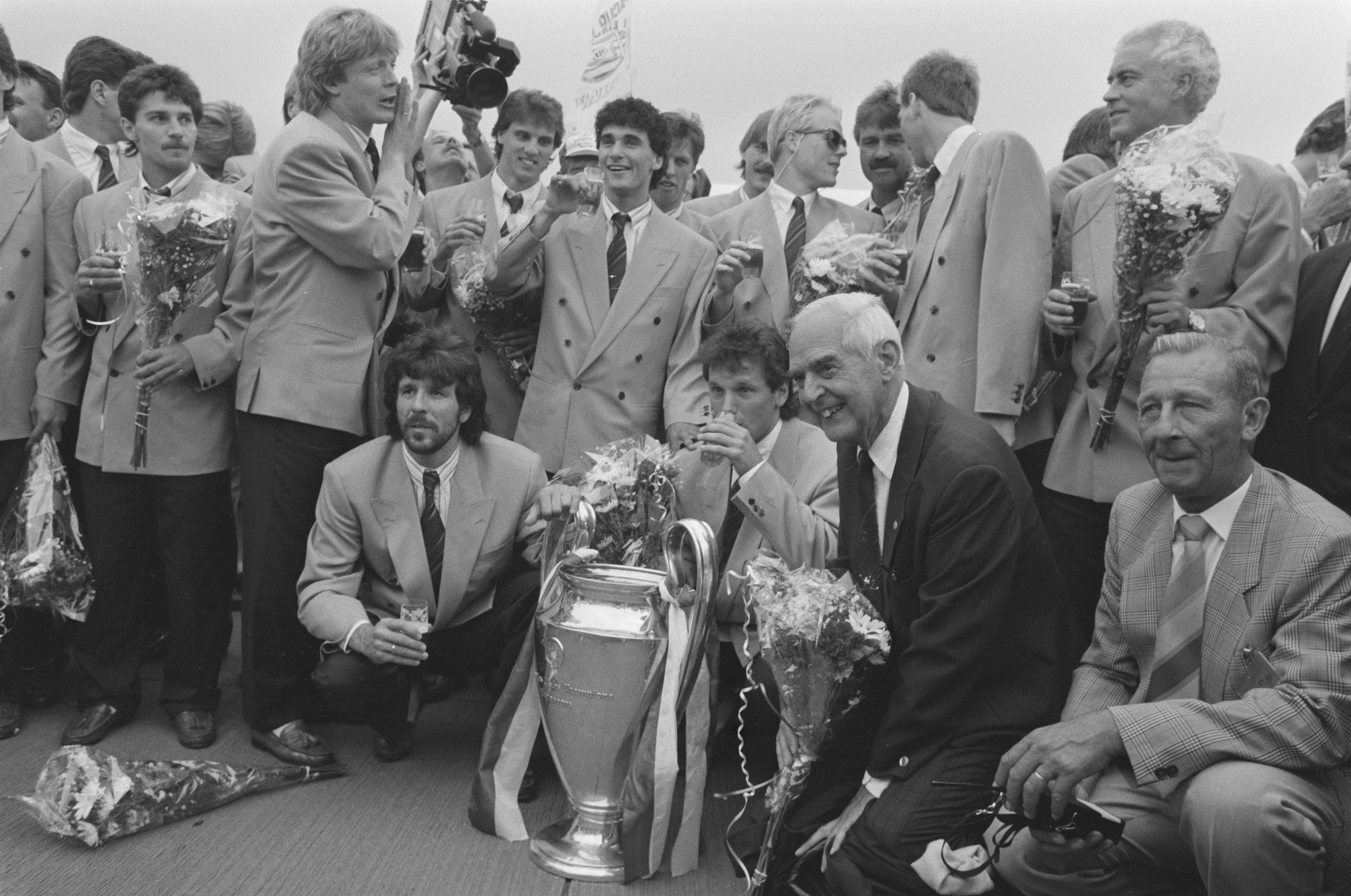
Frits Philips (right) and Eric Gerets (left) posing with the European Cup on arrival at Eindhoven Airport in 1988

At the age of 100, Frits Philips frequently visited the home football matches of PSV. He did not use the stadium's business lounge; instead he sat in the crowd — section D, row 22, seat 43. The administration of PSV has announced that this seat will remain empty as a memorial for their faithful supporter. The night he died, supporters paid their tribute in a minute's silence for their "Mr. Frits" prior to the match (PSV-Fenerbahçe 2-0, 6 December 2005).

A glossy magazine targeted at Eindhoven is named "Frits" in his honor.

The Muziekgebouw Frits Philips concert hall is named after him, the restaurant located in the building is named "Meneer Frits".

== Evoluon ==
In 1966 the company Philips celebrated its 75th anniversary. For this occasion, Frits Philips wanted to give the people of Eindhoven a beautiful gift to support education. The result was a building named Evoluon, based on a sketch which he made on a paper napkin. The Evoluon was used as an educational centre for science and technology.

In 1989 the city closed the Evoluon to the public and adapted it for use as a conference centre, much to Philips' regret. In the last years of his life, he tried to raise interest to restore the Evoluon and return it to public uses for the citizens of Eindhoven.

== The Caux Round Table ==
In 1986, Frits Philips launched the Caux Round Table (CRT) group of senior European, Japanese and American business executives. Alarmed to hear that the Japanese were dumping their products on the western market, he feared a growing trade war. He saw the need to build trust among international executives and for Corporate Social Responsibility practices. The CRT's Principles for Business were published in 1994, incorporating western concepts (human dignity...) and Japanese ones (kyosei, interpreted as “living and working together for the common good”). An international code of good practices written by such senior industrialists from such varied backgrounds remains exceptional today. It was presented to the UN Social Summit in Copenhagen in 1994. It has since become a standard work, translated into 12 languages, and has been used as the basis for internal ethical assessments by international companies such as Nissan.

== Art Collection and Auction ==
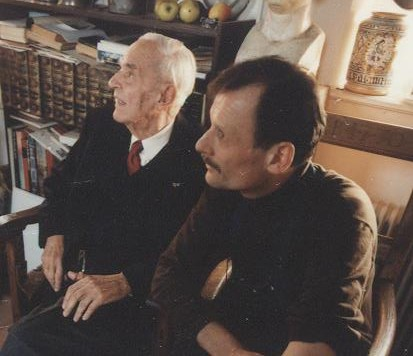
Frits Philips with artist Henri Bol

A large part of the great art collection famously collected by Mr. and Mrs. Philips was auctioned off on December the 4th and 5th 2006 by Sotheby's in the Evoluon in the city of Eindhoven. The auction catalog included a foreword called "Memories of my father" by Digna Hintzen-Philips, the eldest daughter of Frits Philips. It recalls the passion of collecting works of art and the personal friendship which Frits Philips maintained with the Dutch painters Sierk Schröder, Kees Bol and Henri Boi.

The auction ultimately raised 5.7 million euro. The special collection of tin objects, some of which dated from the Middle Ages attracted much interest. A goblet of the "Voerlieden" guild attributed to Engelbertus Moorrees, master in Nijmegen, with year 1781 engraved, was sold for 36,000 euro. There was also a large collection of Delft tiles, and when it came to the silver objects there was a set of four silver candlesticks by Dirk ten Brink with Amsterdam labels dated from 1718 which went for 108,000 euro.

A panel depicting an enthroned Virgin and Child with an Angel by the "Master of Saint Ildefonso" in the Netherlands, also known as the "Master of the Verbeeck Triptych", was awarded to an American art dealer for 258,400 euro. Among the paintings there was a Dutch 19th-century painting which stood out, depicting a Shepherd with his flock by Anton Mauve. There were also a few rare globes manufactured by Vincenzo Coronelli from around 1696, which together fetched 117,000 euro. Furthermore, a polychrome pottery relic box from Limoges, some statues, jewels and books. In the end more than 300 memorabilia went to auction.

== Awards and honours ==
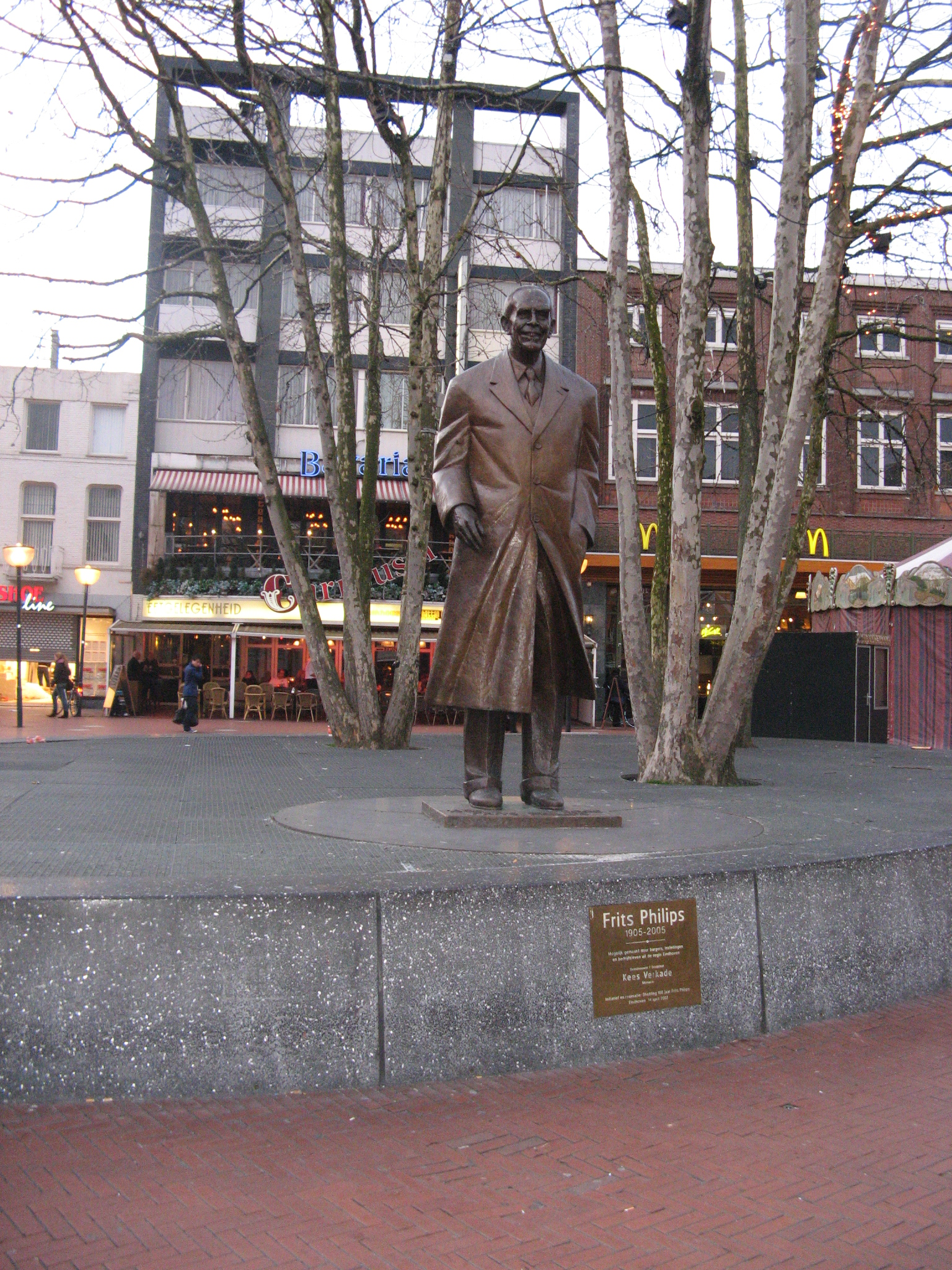
Statue of Frits Philips in Eindhoven by Kees Verkade

Frits Philips has received many honorary titles and awards during his life.

- 1965, he received honorary citizenship of the city of Eindhoven for his "exceptional contributions to the welfare of the citizens of Eindhoven".
- 1965, he was included in the Dutch royal ranks of Orange-Nassau (rank of commander).
- 1970, he was knighted as Knight in the Order of the Netherlands Lion. He has also received honorary titles in many countries, including Japan, Spain, Denmark and China. See for a complete list of honours and decorations.
- 1995, on his 90th birthday, the Muziekgebouw Frits Philips concert hall was named after him.
- 1996, he was honoured as "Righteous Among the Nations" by the Israeli Holocaust museum, Yad Vashem, for saving the lives of 382 Jewish employees of Philips during World War II.
- 1999, he was named "Dutch entrepreneur of the century".
- 2005, on 5 April to mark his 100th birthday, Eindhoven was officially renamed "Frits Philips Stad" for the day.

=== Honours ===
- Grand Officer of the Order of Orange-Nassau
- Knight of the Order of the Netherlands Lion
- Commander of the Order of St. Gregory the Great
- Officer of the Legion of Honour
- Commander of the Order of the Dannebrog
- Commander of the Order of the Cedar
- Grand Officer of the Order of May for Merit
- Order of the Rising Sun, 3rd Class
- Commander of the Order of the Crown
- Officer of the Order of the Southern Cross
- Gold Decoration of Honour for Services to the Republic of Austria
- Commander of the Order of St. Olav
- Grand Officer of the Order of the Republic
- Grand Officer of the Order of Gorkha Dakshina Bahu
- Knight 2nd Class (Grand Officer) of the Order of the Sacred Treasure
- Grand Cross of the Order of Merit of the Italian Republic
- Grand Officer of the Order of Ouissam Alaouite
- Grand Officer of the Order of Merit (Peru)
- Grand Officer of the Order of Bernardo O'Higgins
- Special Cravat of the Order of Brilliant Star
- Grand Cross of the Order of Merit of the Republic of Spain
- Grand Officer of the Order of Leopold II
- Grand Officer of the Order of Prince Henry
