= Jan Gregoor =

Dutch painter (1914–1982)

- Born: Johannes Jacobus Gregoor; April 9, 1914; The Hague, Netherlands
- Died: May 20, 1982 (aged 68); Meerveldhoven, Netherlands
- Education: Royal Academy of Art, The Hague
- Known for: Painting, drawing, art education

Johannes Jacobus "Jan" Gregoor (April 9, 1914 – May 20, 1982) was a Dutch painter and art educator. His works were extensively exhibited in art galleries and museums throughout the Netherlands. He taught art at the Design Academy Eindhoven, alongside Kees Bol.

Gregoor was born in The Hague, where he studied at the Dutch Royal Academy of Art. During World War II, he put his art skills in service of the Dutch resistance, when (sometimes along with Max Velthuijs) he forged stamps in identity papers of people in hiding. His work concentrated among others on urban and industrial landscapes. Among his many students were Helen Berman, Frans Clement, Els Coppens-van de Rijt, Jan Dibbets, and Hans van Vroonhoven. His brother, Nol Gregoor, was a famous Dutch art critic and essayist.
