= Helen Berman =

Dutch painter

Helen Berman הלן ברמן
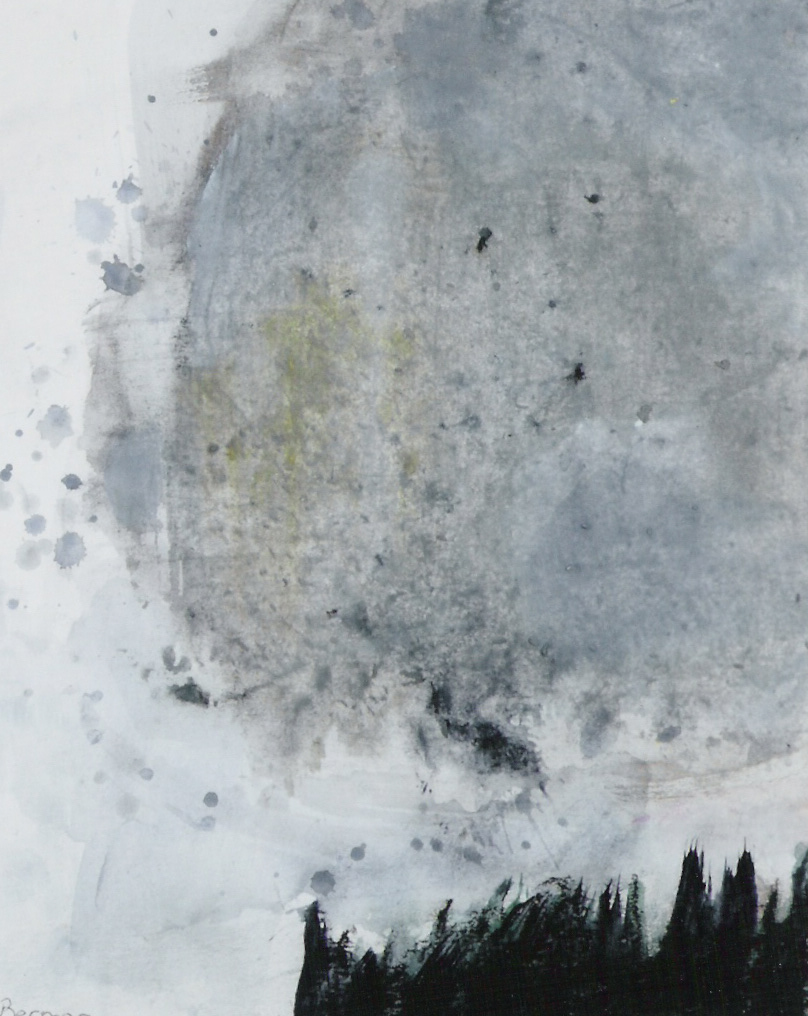
- Grey Sun, 1997
- Born: Hélène Julia Cohen; 6 April 1936 (age 90); Amsterdam, Netherlands
- Education: Kees Bol, Jan Gregoor, Thierry Veltman
- Known for: Painting, Drawing, Design
- Style: Modern art, Postmodern art
- Movement: Abstract expressionism, Lyrical abstraction
- Awards: Van Dissel textile design awards

Helen Berman (Hebrew: הלן ברמן; born 6 April 1936) is a Dutch-Israeli visual artist. She was a textile designer in the 1960s and has been a painter and occasionally an art educator since the 1970s. She is well known in Israel and has exhibited also in Germany and the Netherlands. She created modern and postmodern art and has engaged in realistic impressionism and lyrical abstract expressionism.

== Biography ==
Helen Berman was born in Amsterdam and as a young girl survived The Holocaust. She was trained as a textile designer at the Design Academy Eindhoven. While at the academy, she took extracurricular coursework in the free arts with Kees Bol and Jan Gregoor. After her graduation in 1960, Helen Berman designed textiles for several companies. Some of her designs were awarded prizes and publications in professional magazines.

During the seventies, Berman studied painting and drawing with Thierry Veltman, graduating with a teaching degree. In 1978, she immigrated to Israel, where she continued to refine her style. During a decade-long residence in Jaffa, she became part of the local artists' community and a member of the Israel Painters and Sculptors Association. Since 1998, she has been painting and exhibiting from her studio in Tel Mond.

== Exhibitions ==
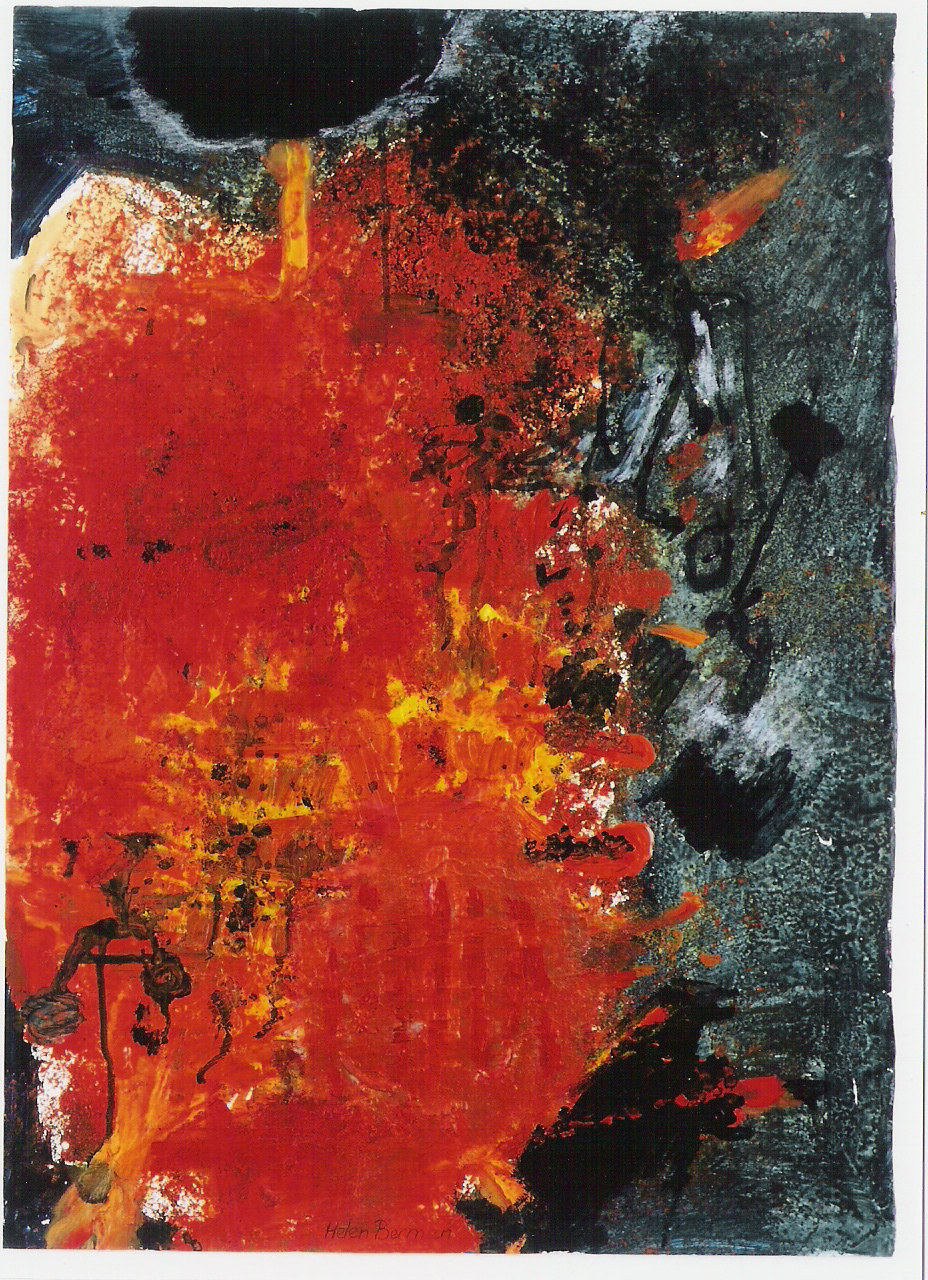
Figure, 1995

Participation	Solo	Group
1970s		1972 – De Schoof, Hendrik-Ido-Ambacht, Netherlands; 1979 – Youth Art Center, Beer Sheva, Israel
1980s	1983 – Itzik's Gallery, Beer Sheva, Israel	1983 – Technology, City Hall, Beer Sheva, Israel; 1989 – Animals, Gallery 13½, Jaffa, Tel Aviv, Israel
1990s	1990 – Gallery Amalia Arbel, Rishon Lezion, Israel; 1996 – Zaritsky Artists' House, Tel Aviv, Israel; 1997 – Schwing Residence, Old Jaffa Artists Quarter, Israel	1990 – New Faces, Zaritsky Artists' House, Tel Aviv, Israel; 1998 – Festive Fruits, Cultural Center, Tel Mond, Israel
2000s	2000 – Elah Center, Pninat Ayalon, Tel Aviv, Israel; 2003 – Zaritsky Artists' House, Tel Aviv, Israel; 2004 – Gallery Re-Lai-S, Baden-Baden, Germany; 2006 – Residenz Bären, Baden-Baden, Germany; 2008 – Elah Center, Pninat Ayalon, Tel Aviv, Israel; 2009 – Sharon Landscapes, Zaritsky Artists' House, Tel Aviv, Israel	2003 – Genesis, Culture Hall, Or Akiva, Israel; 2004 – Dutch Days, Castra Art Center, Haifa, Israel; 2007 – Open Park, Zaritsky Artists' House, Tel Aviv, Israel
2010s	2012 – Sharon Landscapes, Tova Osman Art Gallery, Tel Aviv, Israel; 2017 – Arrived without purpose, Tova Osman Art Gallery, Tel Aviv, Israel	2015 – 10 Years Gallery Re-Lai-S, Residenz Bären, Baden-Baden, Germany
