= Lichtjesroute =

Route of Lights Lichtjesroute
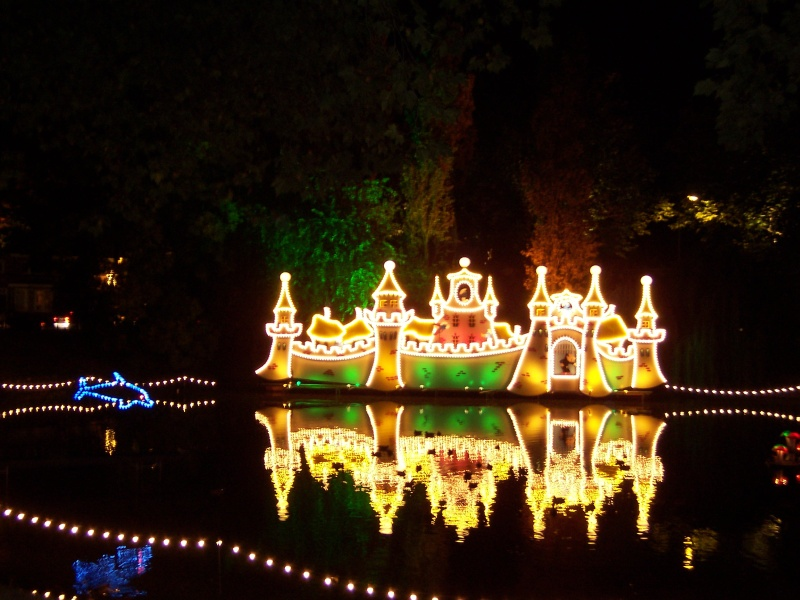
- The Hendrik de Keyzerplein during the Lichtjesroute in 2005.
- Genre: Festival
- Begins: 18 September
- Ends: 2nd Sunday in October
- Frequency: Annual
- Locations: Eindhoven, the Netherlands
- Years active: 24 (original); 42 (modern)
- Inaugurated: 18 September 1945 (original); 18 September 1984 (modern)
- Most recent: 21 September 1969 (original); Ongoing (modern)
- Website: lichtjesroute.org

The Lichtjesroute (Dutch pronunciation: [ˈlɪxtɕəsˌrutə, ˈlɪxjəsˌrutə]; "Route of Lights") is a festival held every autumn in Eindhoven of the southern Netherlands. It starts with a parade on 18 September, celebrating the liberation of Eindhoven during World War II on the same date in 1944. The Lichtjesroute is celebrated not only to commemorate the liberation, but also to create an illusion of "fairytales in light".

== Origin ==
During the first commemoration of the liberation of Eindhoven, following the Battle of Eindhoven in September 1944, a Feestverlichtingscomité (Committee of Party Lighting) was formed. The festival committee members included the Municipal Energy company Gemeentelijk Energiebedrijf, Philips, the Federation of Neighbourhood Associations (Federatie van Buurtverenigingen), the Eindhoven Installer Association (Eindhovensche Installateursvereniging), and the tourist board Association for Foreign Traffic (Vereniging voor Vreemdelingenverkeer). The committee had the idea to utilize the lights for the celebration. The inhabitants of Eindhoven were asked to help by making their houses shine in any way possible for one day. Because electricity were still in short supply after the war, lights came from candles at the windows.

After 1947, the Foundation for Liberation Commemoration (Stichting Bevrijdingsherdenking) took over coordination of all festival activities. The original day of lights was transformed into a "route of lights". In several places throughout the city, dubbed Focal Points or Fire Points (Brandpunten), celebration lighting illuminated the area for four days, between 20:00 and 24:00 each day.

In the following years, the number of Fire Points grew steadily. By 1969, 25 years after the liberation, the route had grown to a length of no less than 40 kilometres (25 mi). This would be the last year the Lichtjesroute was celebrated for more than a decade.

In 1984, a number of enthusiasts decided it was time to give the Lichtjesroute a new life. Through a mailing, a thousand corporations were asked for financial support, and the local media called for volunteers to help make the new Lichtjesroute a reality.

== The route today ==
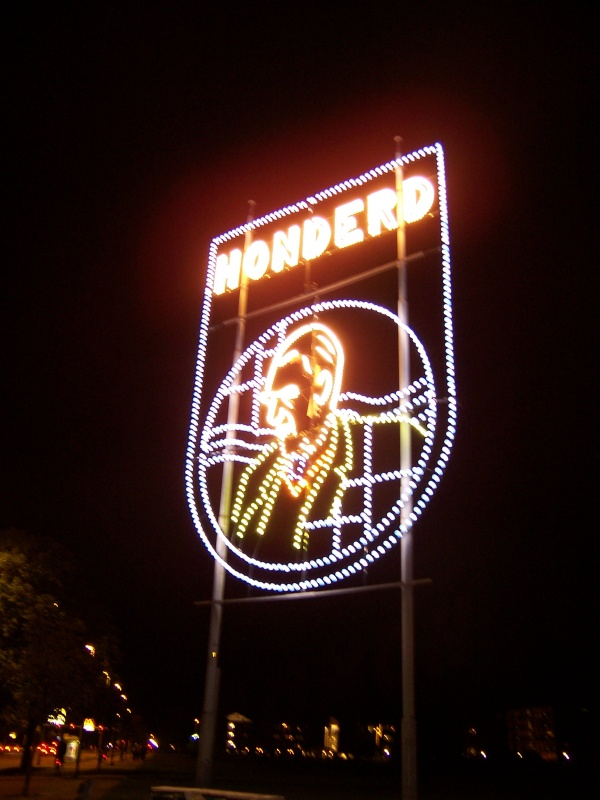
A depiction of Frits Philips to celebrate his hundredth birthday.

The Lichtjesroute, as revived in 1984, consists of a route through the centre of Eindhoven and through the suburbs of Stratum, Strijp, and Woensel. The route is about 25 kilometres (16 mi) long and is especially popular with smaller children. Families usually travel the route by car; officials have also made it friendly for cyclists who want to follow the route. The route is indicated by reflecting "pointer" signs that show an arrow and a red picture of a light bulb. On some signs, the text fietsroute (cycle route) is also added, to indicate areas where cyclists should follow an alternate route.

Along the route, various frames with ornaments made from lights are mounted onto lamp posts. The ornaments depict various objects and animals; some have World War II–themed imagery. Ornaments are usually grouped by common themes—all animals are located together, for example. The placement of the ornaments changes each year, but in some places, the same ornaments are shown each year. For example, Halvemaanstraat ("Half-moon Street") is always decorated with half-moon crescent shapes. The Vaartbroek area always has ornaments of astrological signs, because the streets there are named after characters from Greek and Roman mythology. In Witte Dorp ("White Village"), there are no ornaments—but red, white, and blue lamps, symbolic of the flag of the Netherlands, are placed on the bay windows, where they shine onto the white houses.

Special resting places are designated on the route, where people can stop for a snack or walk around; one such area is Hendrik de Keyzerplein, a square and small park in a residential area. These points are usually the busiest on the route, and as a result, traffic jams are common there.

== Sustainability ==
In 2006, the Foundation started replacing the incandescent light bulbs with light-emitting diodes (LEDs); an initial batch of one thousand LED bulbs was installed. Over time, the incandescent lights will be retired; wholesale replacement of the existing bulbs would be too expensive. Compact fluorescent lamps, used to save energy in other applications, are not a viable solution because they are not suitable for outside lighting.
