= Jan Dibbets =

Dutch conceptual artist (born 1941)

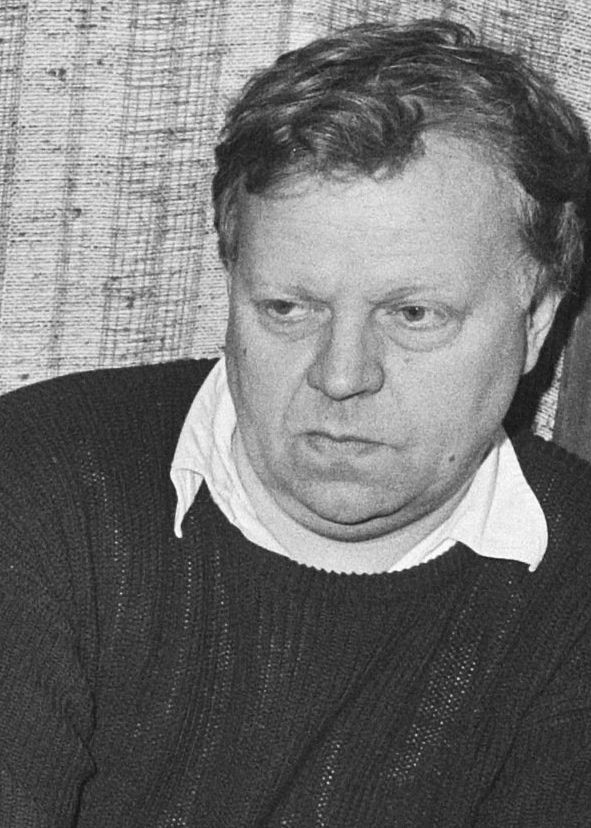
Jan Dibbets, 1986

Jan Dibbets (born 9 May 1941, in Weert) is an Amsterdam-based Dutch conceptual artist. His work is influenced by mathematics and works mainly with photography.

== Life and career ==
In the late 1950s and early 1960s, he started as an art teacher at the Tilburg Academy and studied painting with Jan Gregoor in Eindhoven. He had his first solo exhibition in 1965 at Amsterdam's Galerie 845 and subsequently abandoned painting in 1967. At that same period, he visited London and met Richard Long and other artists working with land art. He returned to Amsterdam, incorporated land-art based theories into his work and began to use photography as a "dialogue between nature and cool geometrical design by rotating the camera on its axis" with his "perspective corrections". His work in the Dutch pavilion at the Venice Biennale in 1972 gave him an international reputation.

In 1994, he was commissioned by the Arago Association to create a memorial to the French astronomer François Arago, known as Hommage à Arago. Dibbets set 135 bronze medallions into the ground along the Paris Meridian between the north and south limits of Paris.

Dibbets's works are included in museums around the world, including the Stedelijk Museum, Amsterdam, Solomon R. Guggenheim Museum, New York, De Pont Museum of Contemporary Art in Tilburg, and the Van Abbemuseum in Eindhoven.

== Books ==
- Robin Redbreast's Territory/Sculpture 1969. Zédélé éditions, Reprint collection, 2014 [1970]. ISBN 978-2-915859-45-4
- Jan Dibbets: Perspective Collection. London: Alan Cristea Gallery. 2007. With foreword by David Cleaton-Roberts, Director of the Alan Cristea Gallery.

== Articles ==
- Rutger Pontzen, Like before, the sea levels everything, Observatoire du Land Art, 4 October 2009. Read online through Latitudes
