= Willy Schmidhamer =

Dutch photographer (born 1938)

- Born: 1938 (age 87–88); Bandung, Indonesia
- Education: Design Academy Eindhoven, Eindhoven Academy for Film
- Known for: Photography
- Awards: Winner – 37th Handsworth Exhibition; 1968; First Prize – Eindhoven World Exhibition of Photography; 1969

Willy Schmidhamer is a Dutch photographer.

Schmidhamer was born in Bandung in 1938 and pursued studies in Industrial and Graphic Design at the Eindhoven Academy for Industrial Design (1955–60), and Film studies at the Amsterdam Academy for Film(1961–63). He specialized in sculpture, painting, film and photography, producing non-figurative works. The artist is much admired for his fragmented body parts expanded in such a way that they become landscape images in black and white. Schmidhamer made in the 1960s experimental films with colleagues in France and Italy and was devoted to experimental photography, printmaking and lithography, in addition to non-figurative painting and sculpture. At the end of the 1960s he received two prizes: Winner of the 37th Handsworth Exhibition, England (1968) and first prize at the Eindhoven World Exhibition of Photography, operated under the auspices of the Noord-Brabants Museum's-Hertogenbosch (1969).

He described his intentions as follows: "De kracht van mijn werk ligt niet aan de oppervlakte. Vaak is datgene, wat men niet ziet, maar wat verborgen aanwezig is als innerlijke kern, bepalend voor de uiteindelijke overdracht."

Schmidhamer's work has been exhibited at the Galerij Dinette (1967), De Herberg, (1968 and 1970) and the Foundation De Krabbedans, Eindhoven (1971 and 1976), and at the Galerie S, (1974) and Canon Galerie, Amsterdam (1975), and at the Galerie “Bon à tirer” Grafica Moderna, Milan, Italy (1976).

== See also ==
- History of erotic photography
