= Muziekgebouw Frits Philips =

Coordinates: 51.438611°N 5.479722°E

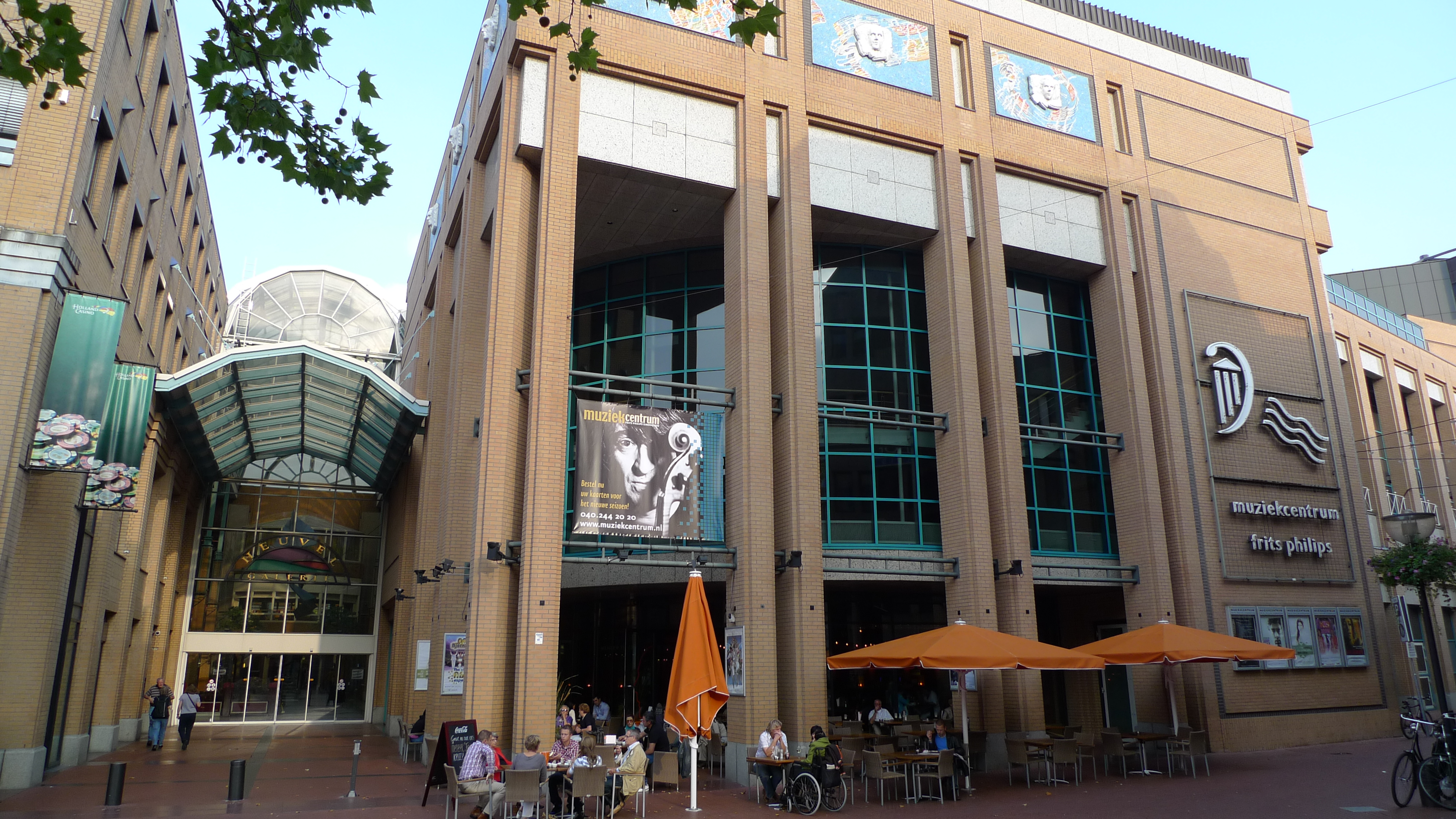
- Interactive map of the Muziekgebouw Frits Philips area

General information
- Type: Concert hall
- Location: Eindhoven, The Netherlands
- Opened: 1992

Other information
- Seating type: Theatre

Website
- www.muziekgebouweindhoven.nl

Muziekgebouw Frits Philips is a concert hall in Eindhoven, the Netherlands. The venue is named after Frits Philips and was opened in 1992.
