= Tord Boontje =

Dutch industrial designer

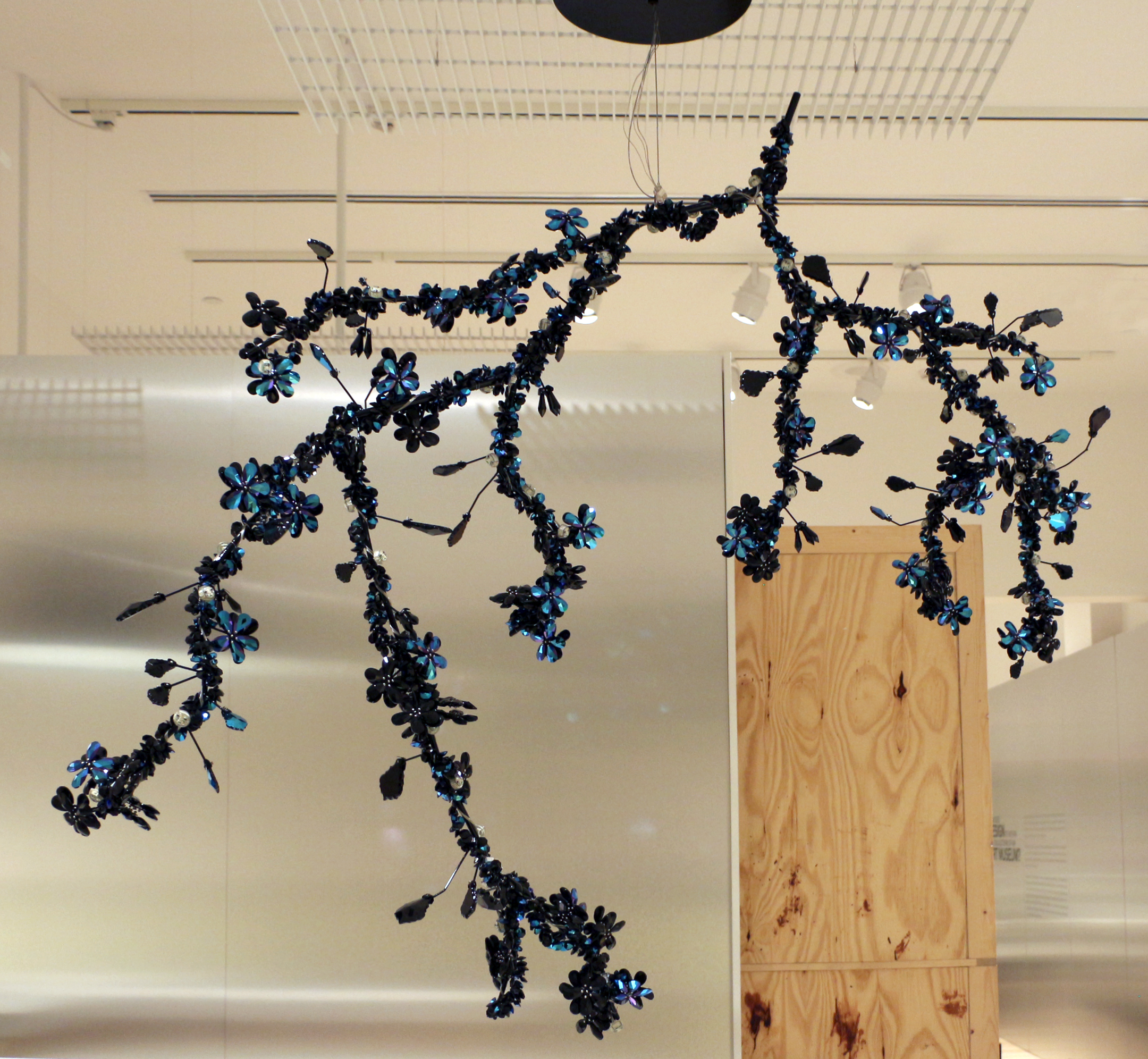
Night Blossom lamp, for Swarovski, 2003

Tord Boontje (b. Oct. 3, 1968 in Enschede, Netherlands) is an industrial product designer.

== Biography ==
He graduated from the Design Academy Eindhoven in 1991 and earned a master's degree from the Royal College of Art (RCA) in London in 1994. After graduation, he founded his eponymous design company, Studio Tord Boontje. In 2006, he created a special holiday collection for Target Department stores. In 2009, he was appointed professor and head of Design Products at RCA and stepped down in 2013 after opening a store in London in 2012. While head of Design Products at RCA, he increased the university's reputation by focusing on research while increasing student recruitment and academic leadership.

== Awards ==
- 2002 – Bombay Sapphire Prize for Glass Design
- 2003 – Designer of the Year, Elle Decoration
- 2003 – Best Lighting Design, Elle Decoration
- 2003 – Reader's Choice for Future Classic, Elle Decoration
- 2004 – Best product, New York Gift Fair
- 2004 – Dedalus Design Award
- 2005 – Innovation Prize for textile collection, Cologne Fair
- 2005 – Dutch Designer of the Year
- 2006 – IF Product Design Award
- 2007 – Red Dot Design Award
- 2008 – Elle Décor Design Award
- 2011 – Wallpaper* Design Awards
- 2013 – Red Dot Design Award

== Milestones ==
- 1991 – Graduated Eindhoven Design Academy
- 1994 – Graduated Royal College of Art
- 1996 – Established Studio Tord Boontje in Peckham, South London
- 2002 – Designed the Garland for Habitat
- 2004 – Happy Ever After installation at Moroso's Milan showroom
- 2005 – Moved to Bourg-Argental, France
- 2007 – Monograph published by Rizzoli New York
- 2009 – Returned to London to take up position at the Royal College of Art
- 2012 – Moves studio to Shoreditch, East London and opens his first retail space
- 2013 – Steps down as Head of Design Products
- 2015 – ORIGINALS selling exhibition at Sotheby's London with Emma Woffenden
