= Frank Dekkers =

Dutch painter of landscapes

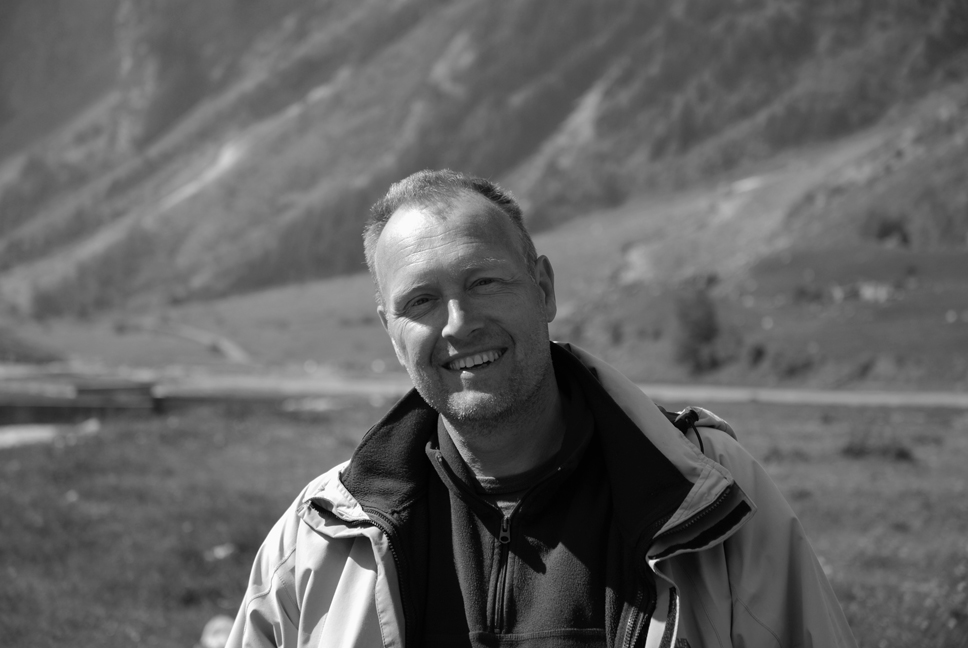
- Frank Dekkers in June 2009
- Born: 1961 (age 63–64); Nijmegen, Netherlands
- Education: Utrecht School of the Arts
- Known for: painting, drawing, lithography, woodcuts

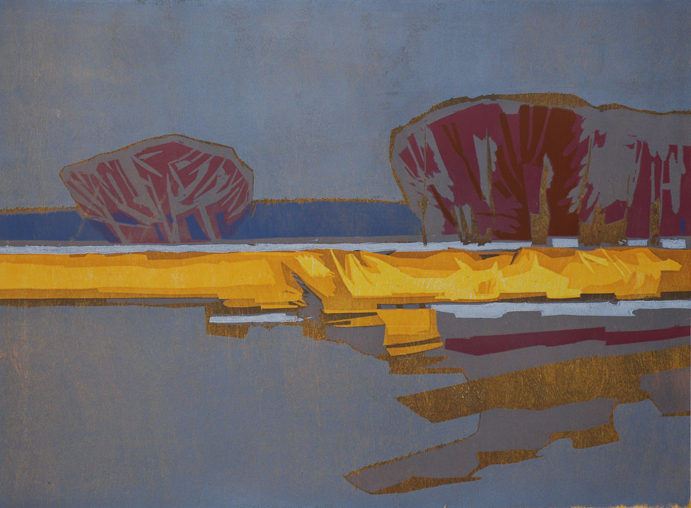
Woodcut of the Oude Waal, 2007, 65x88 cm

Frank Dekkers (born 1961 in Nijmegen) is a Dutch painter of landscapes. He studied painting and graphics at the Utrecht School of the Arts. His work is influenced by artist Kees Bol, with whom he interned in 1984.

Dekkers makes aquarels, paintings and drawings on location and in particular near rivers. Based on his impressions, he creates woodcuts, lithographs and large paintings in his studio.

== Museum exhibitions ==
- 1991 - Taipei Fine Arts Museum, Taipei, Taiwan
- 1993 - Ino-cho Paper Museum, Ino, Kōchi, Japan
- 1996 - Ino-cho Paper Museum, Ino, Kōchi, Japan
- 1998 - Singer Museum, Laren, Netherlands
- 1999 - Museum The Old Town Hall, Leerdam, Netherlands
- 2002 - City Museum, IJsselstein, Netherlands
- 2005 - Municipal Museum, Vianen, Netherlands

== Books and catalogues ==
- 1999 - De plek (The place), with art by Dekkers and Jeroen Hermkens, and texts by Michael Martone.
- 2001 - Frank Dekkers, with texts by Rimme Rypkema
- 2006 - Aan de rivier (At the river), with poetry by Menno van der Beek, Mark Boog, Lenze Bouwers, Chrétien Breukers, and Abe de Vries
- 2006 - Winterreise (Winter journey)
- 2009 - Oorverdovend stil (Deafening stillness), with texts by Dick Adelaar, Bianca Ruiz, Christina Hosman and Jeroen Hermkens
