= The Stone Twins =

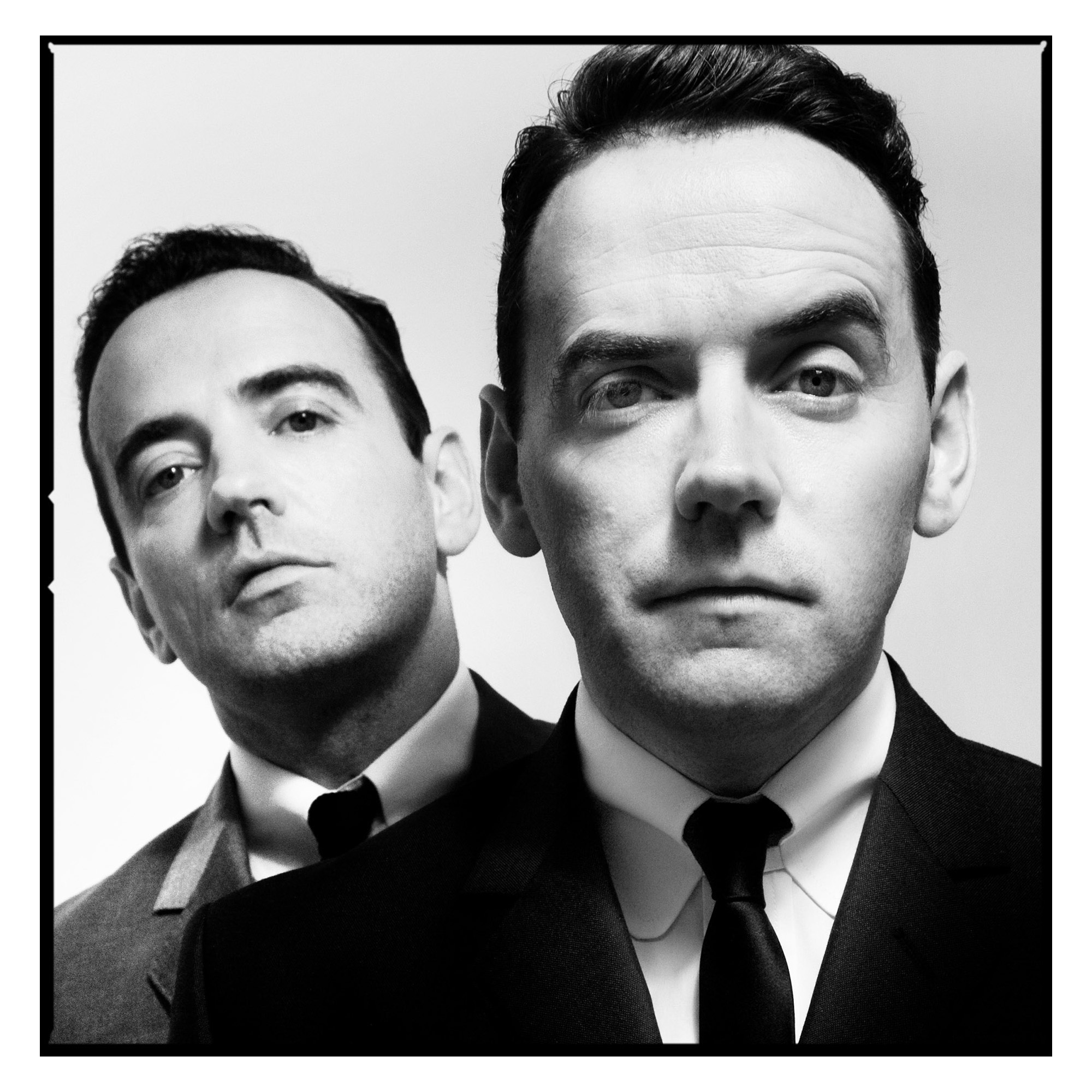
The Stone Twins – Declan (left) and Garech Stone – photographed by Krijn van Noordwijk. A homage to the David Bailey portrait of the Kray twins, 1965.

The Stone Twins is a creative branding agency based in Amsterdam. It was founded by twin brothers Declan and Garech Stone (born 8 November 1970, Dublin), graduates of the National College of Art and Design, Dublin.

The Stone Twins specialise in areas such as brand strategy, naming and brand identity (both visual and verbal). Their work has been described as concept-led, witty, thought-provoking and pioneering. The firm is best known for the branding of MassiveMusic and A'DAM Toren, as well as the design of several Irish commemorative postage stamps. The Stone Twins' award-winning portfolio includes a coveted Dutch Design Award, several European Design Awards and 13 D&AD Pencils. Their work forms part of the permanent collections of the Cooper Hewitt, Smithsonian Design Museum, New York, and the Stedelijk Museum Amsterdam.

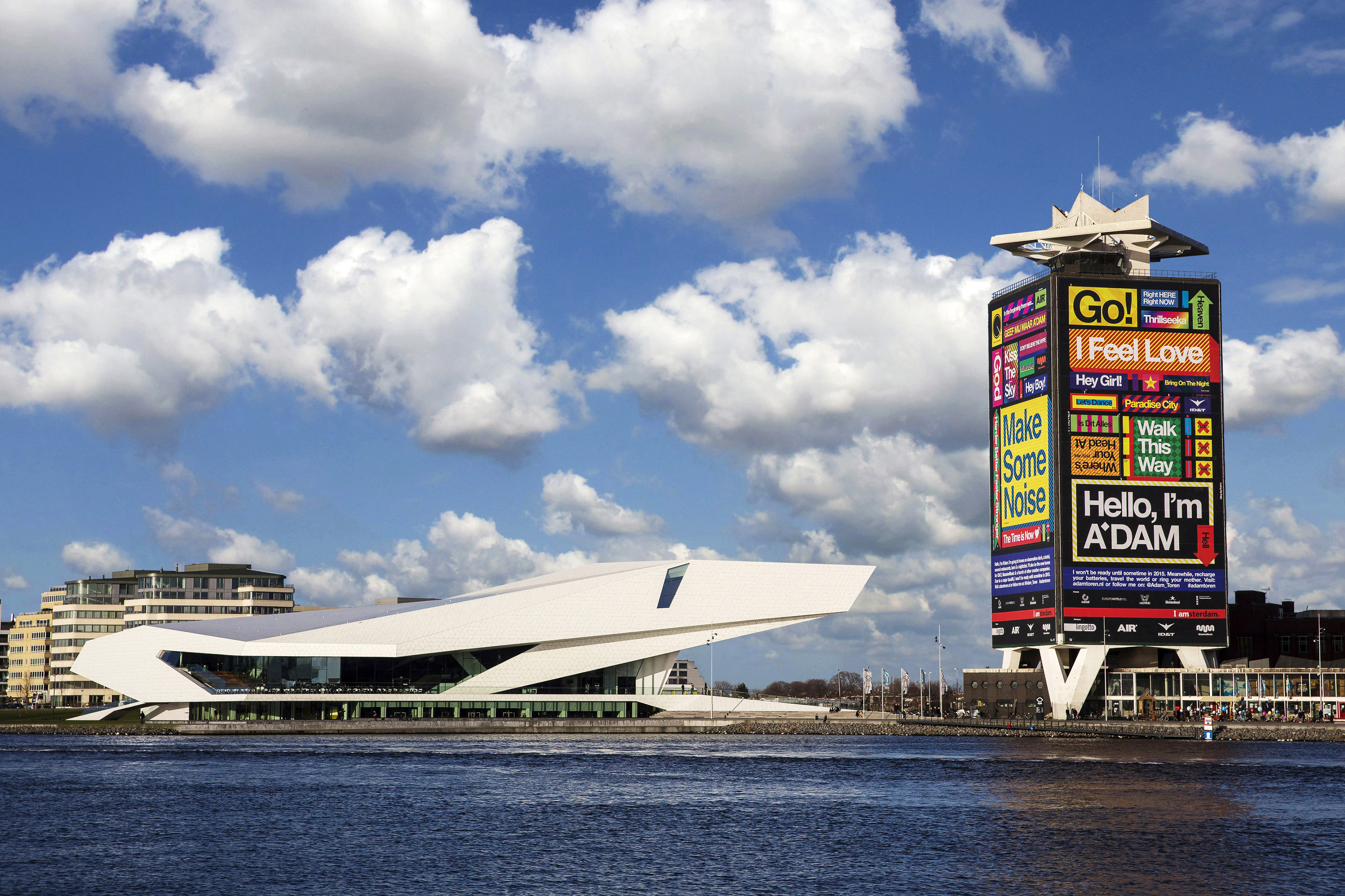
A’DAM Toren: Naming, brand strategy and identity by The Stone Twins.

The Stone Twins regularly write for trade magazines, including Communicatie (Wolters Kluwer) and Eye magazine: the International Review of Graphic Design. They are the authors of the critically acclaimed book Logo R.I.P. (A Commemoration of Dead Logos); the updated 2nd edition was launched in the Cooper Hewitt, Smithsonian Design Museum, New York in 2012. They are keen educators, and were Head of the ‘Man and Communication' department at Design Academy Eindhoven from 2008 until their resignation in 2013. The Stone Twins are also co-founders and partners in Est. (Established Sparkling Tea), a premium non-alcoholic drinks company based in Amsterdam.

== Books ==
The Stone Twins have written the following books:

- Logo R.I.P., (A Commemoration of Dead Logos), BIS Publishers, 2012. (ISBN 9789063692902)
- A Catalogue of Curiosities, Relics, Art & Propaganda (CRAP), 2010.
- Hello, I'm A'DAM (The Creation of a New Amsterdam Icon), A'DAM Toren C.V., 2021. (ISBN 9789082075885)
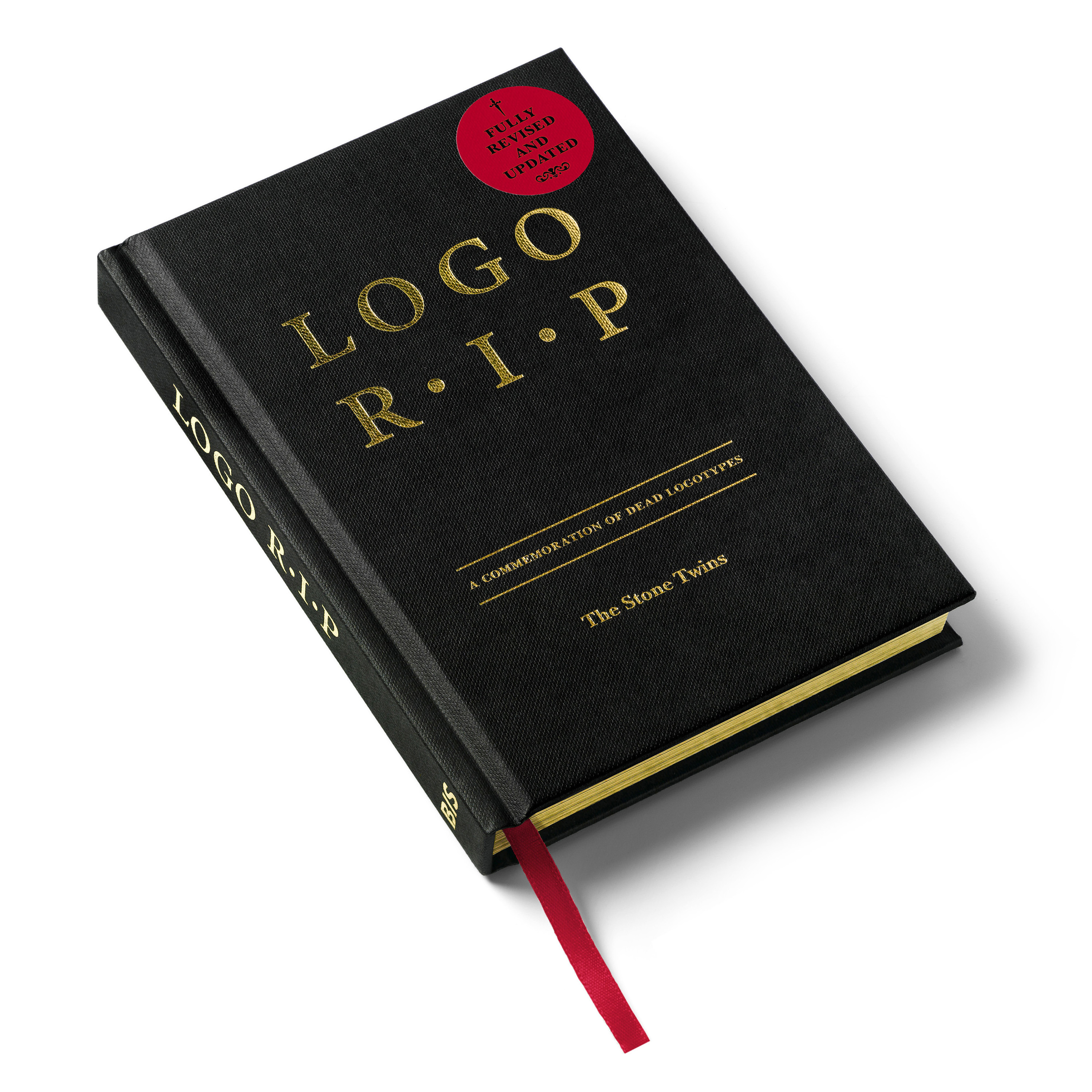
  Logo R.I.P. by The Stone Twins, 2012.

== Magazine Articles ==
Selected articles written by The Stone Twins:

- Chameleons (Single-character logos provide rich, raw material for identity design) – Eye, No. 67, Vol. 17, Spring 2008.
- Logos without words – Eye, No. 80, Vol. 20, Summer 2011.
- Something Is Rotten in the State of Design – Design Week, August 2015. Republished in: Open Manifesto #8: Change, 2018.
- Design & Humour – 100 Archive: Dialogues, 8th April 2020.

== Exhibitions ==
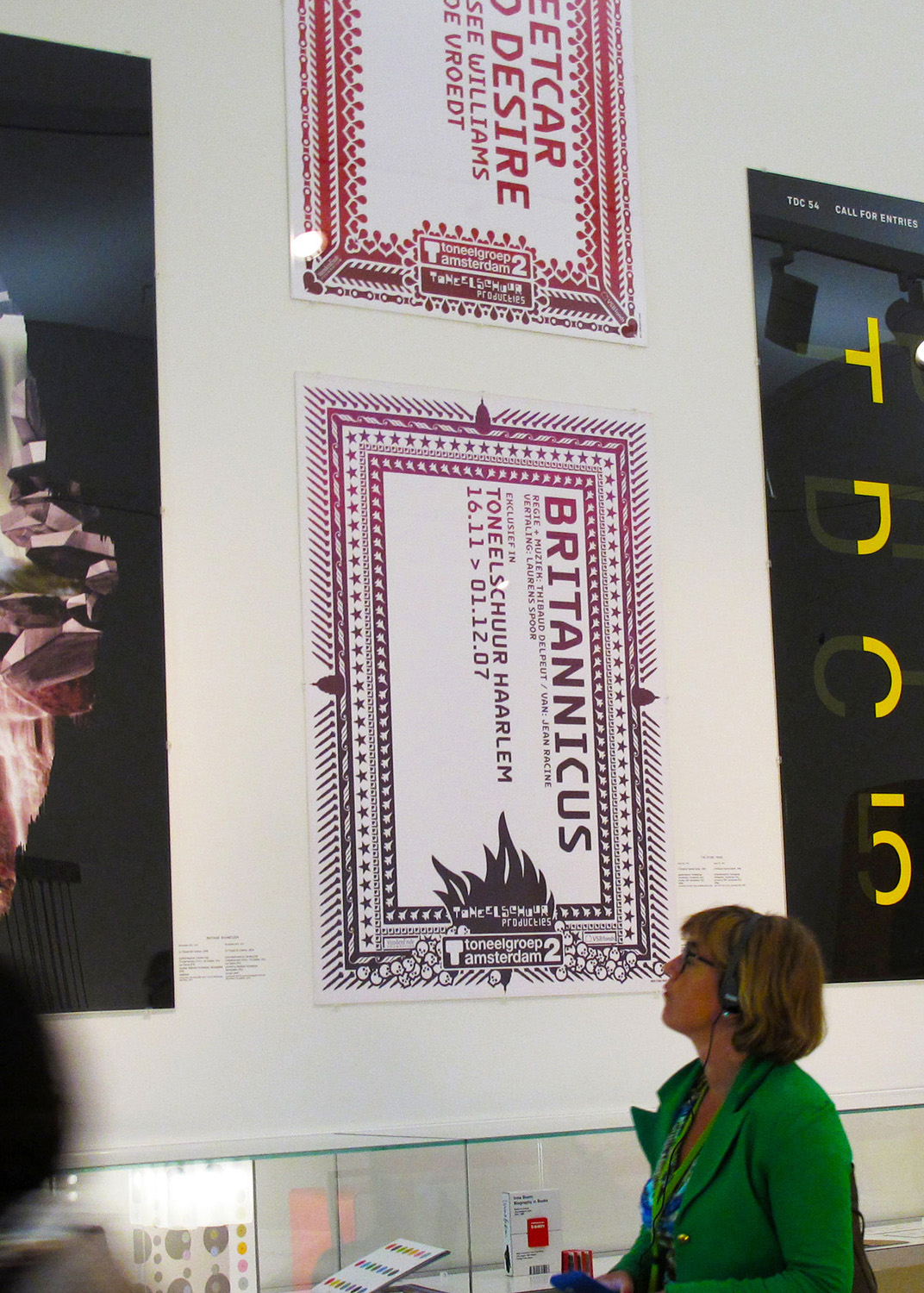
TA-2 poster series at the Stedelijk Museum Amsterdam, 2014

Selected exhibitions:

- 2015 Liminal – Irish design at the threshold, Eindhoven, Milan, New York and Dublin (group show)
- 2012 New Graphic Design Collection, Stedelijk Museum Amsterdam (group show)
- 2012 Graphic Design: Now in Production, Walker Art Center, Minneapolis and the Cooper-Hewitt National Design Museum, New York (group show)
- 2011 Underground by The Stone Twins, Zeeuws Museum, Middelburg (art installation)
- 2008 1600 X Zierikzee by The Stone Twins, Zeeuws Museum, Middelburg (art installation)

== Controversies and criticism ==
In 2020, the agency began a self-initiated project questioning the fearmongering surrounding COVID-19 and the proportionality of the measures/restrictions.
