= Tom Gottelier =

English Creative Director and Designer

- Born: 1988 (age 37–38); London, England
- Education: Design Academy Eindhoven; The Royal College of Art
- Occupation: Designer
- Known for: Royal Amateur Expedition Society (RAES); Featuring Featuring; Designers on Holiday (DOH)

Tom Gottelier (born 1988) is an English creative based in London.

Gottelier was born in London. He studied at the Design Academy Eindhoven and graduated from Design Products at The Royal College of Art in 2013. He is the founder of the Royal Amateur Expedition Society (RAES) and co-founder of the creative studio Featuring Featuring. He is also a Co Founder of "Designers on Holiday" (DOH) along with Bobby Petersen, an annual design festival located on Gotland, Sweden.

Since 2022 he has worked as a creative strategist inside JPL and NASA working on environmental experience projects like the Earth Information Center and public artworks such as the Europa Clipper Trajectory Clock.

Alongside his colleagues at the time, Bobby Petersen and Ed Thomas, Tom was awarded the Hospital Club's hclub100 award in 2013, described by The Guardian as "an annual campaign to identify the 100 most influential and innovative people working across arts, culture and the creative industries in the UK". The award was given due to the trio's work on The Paper Pulp Helmet; other winners of the award that year included Steve McQueen (film director), Marcus Fairs (founder of Dezeen) and Cara Delevingne (model).

== Exhibitions ==
- Desire (New York 2025)
- Blended Worlds (Los Angeles 2024)
- Seeing Rural (Santa Barbara 2018)
- The Voice of Things (London 2015)
- Heals Craft Market’ Made by Works (London 2014)
- Self Unself (Suzhou Jinji Lake Art Museum 2014)
- Self Unself (Van Abbe Museum, Eindhoven, 2013)
- Out of the Woods: Adventures of 12 Hardwood Chairs (Victoria and Albert Museum, London, 2012)

== Publications ==
- Paradise, with co-editors Bobby Petersen and James Shaw, Royal College of Art 2012. ISBN 978-1907342509
- Cabin Porn, 2019.
