= Els Coppens-van de Rijt =

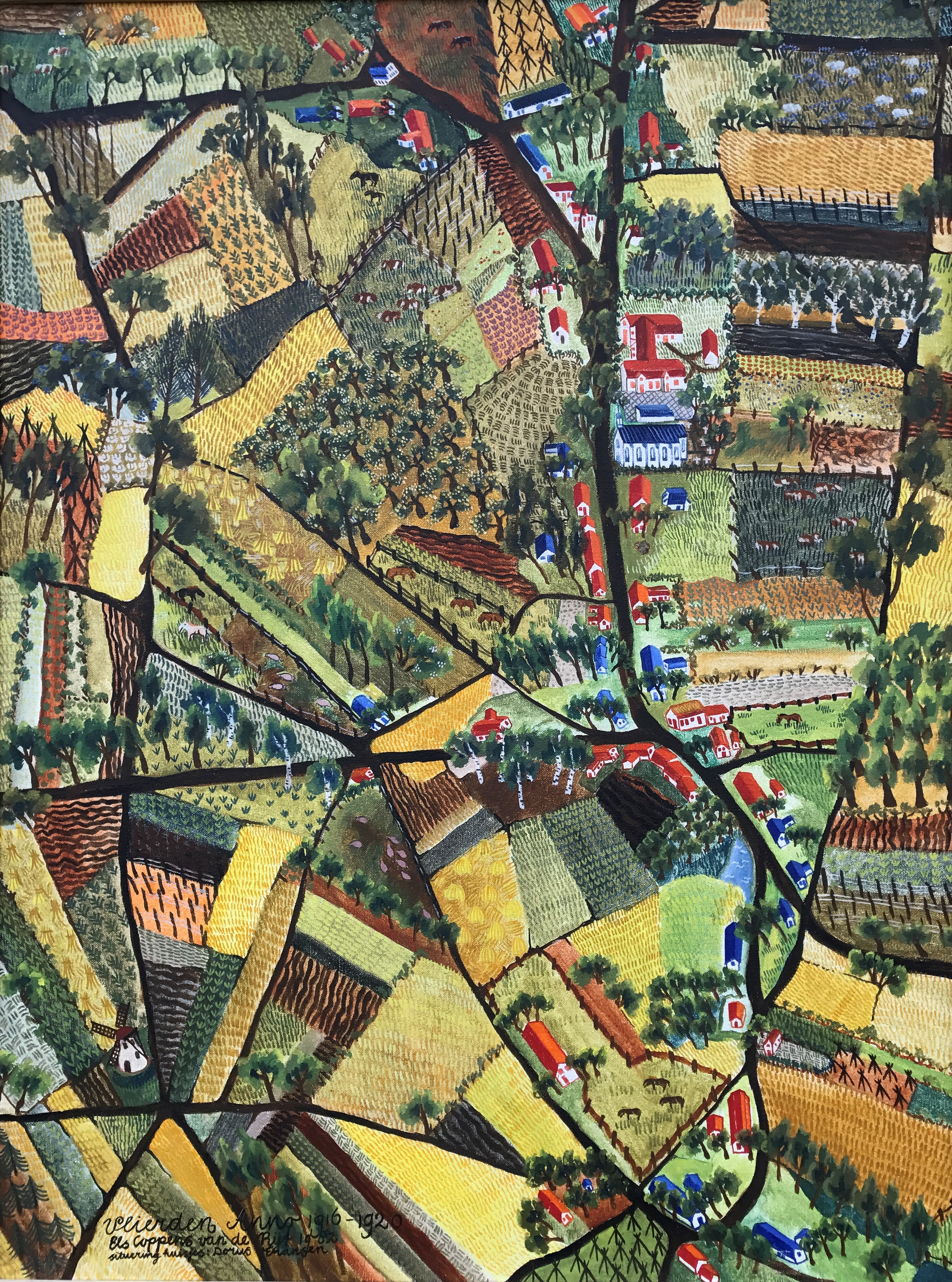
A painting by Els Coppens-van de Rijt

Johanna Elisabeth "Els" Coppens-van de Rijt (born August 18, 1943) is an artist and author from Vlierden, Netherlands.

Coppens-van de Rijt was born in Sint-Oedenrode, as one of twins to a Roman Catholic family with 11 children. She studied at the Design Academy Eindhoven with Kees Bol and Jan Gregoor and at the Art Academy of Maastricht. Here she met her husband, sculptor Joep Coppens.

After her studies she made name as a painter, in particular of portraits. She ceased painting, however, due to Ehlers–Danlos syndrome. Since, she has been writing among others on her Christian belief.

== Books written ==
- 1996 – The other reality
- 1997 – I stayed at the edge of the river
- 2002 – Frank letters of belief ISBN 90-806908-1-3
- 2008 – Martien Coppens, from village boy to city man (with Joep Coppens)
