= Conceptual design =

Early phase of the design process

Conceptual design is an early phase of the design process, in which the broad outlines of function and form of something are articulated. It includes the design of interactions, experiences, processes, and strategies. It involves an understanding of people's needs and how to meet them with products, services, and processes. Common artifacts of conceptual design are concept sketches and models.

== See also ==
- Concept art
- Social design
