= Jan Boelen =

Belgian curator

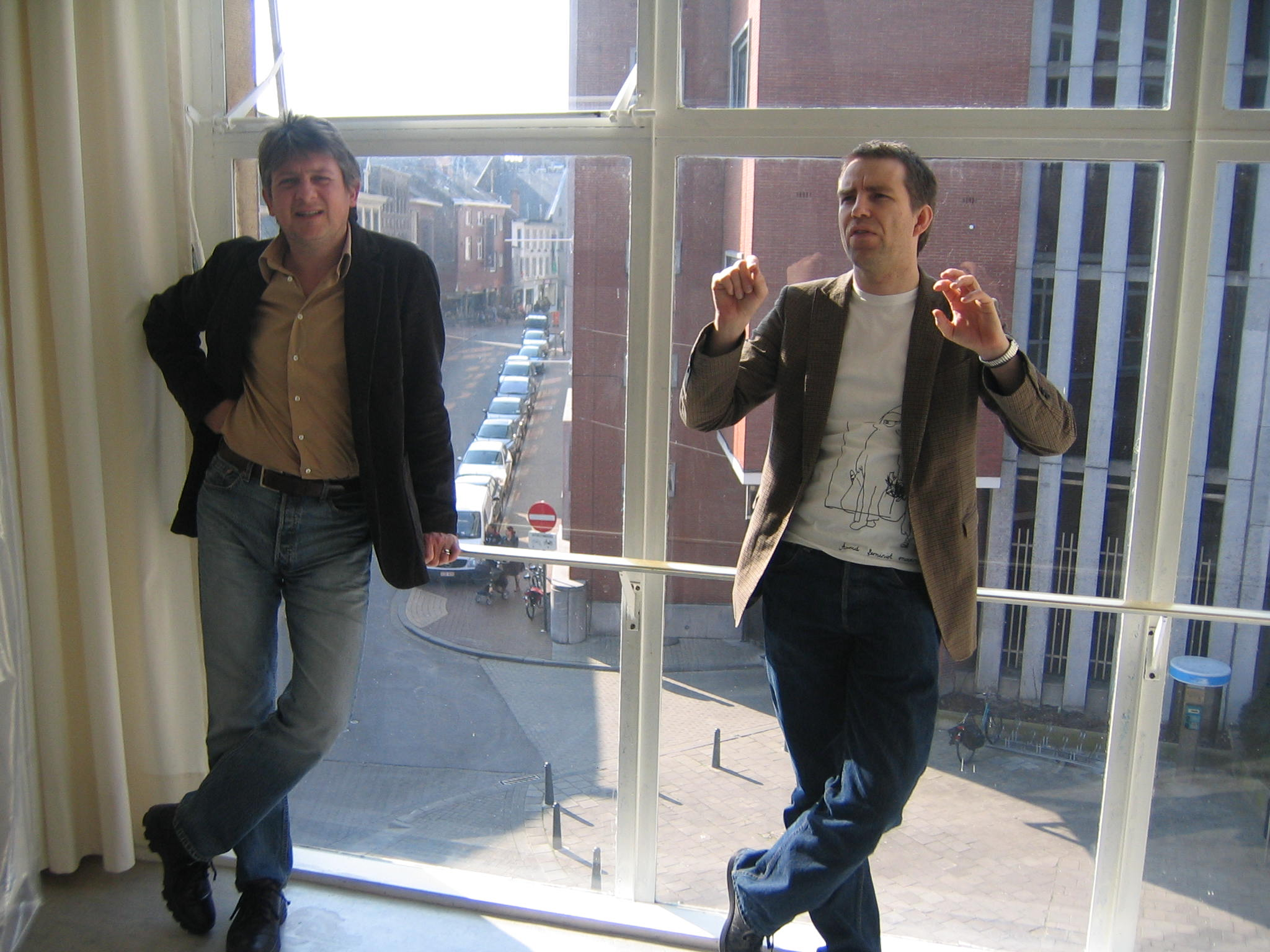
- Rob and Jan Boelen
- Born: 1967 (age 57–58); Genk

Jan Boelen (born 1967 in Genk, Belgium) is a curator of design, architecture and contemporary art. He studied Product Design at the Media & Design Academy in Genk, and he is the founder and former artistic director of Z33 – house for contemporary art in Hasselt, Belgium.

Boelen was the head of the Masters program in "Social Design" and the Masters program in "Design Curating and Writing" at the Design Academy Eindhoven, Netherlands; he is a member of the Flemish Committee for Architecture and Design. Boelen developed the idea of a European Design Parliament as a driving force for change, and he curated the international design festival BIO 50 in Ljubljana, Slovenia, the oldest design biennial in Europe. Since 2016, Jan Boelen has held the position of artistic director of Atelier LUMA, an experimental laboratory for design at LUMA Arles in Arles, France. In 2018, Boelen curated the 4th Istanbul Design Biennial A School of Schools. He held lectures in international cultural institutions and universities, such as Harvard University in Cambridge. He is appointed curator of the Lithuanian Pavilion at the postponed 17th Biennale Architettura in Venice, which opened in May, 2021. From 2019 to March 2022, Boelen has been director of the Karlsruhe University of Arts and Design. He is one of the initiators of the international research program Driving the Human, taking place in 2020-23. Since 2016, Jan Boelen has held the position of artistic director of Atelier LUMA, an experimental laboratory for design at LUMA Arles in Arles, France. He co-edited the book (with Michael Kaethler): Social Matter, Social Design: For Good or Bad all Design is Social.
