= Thierry Veltman =

Dutch artist and educator

- Born: December 16, 1939; Bussum, Netherlands
- Died: July 2023 (aged 83)
- Known for: Painting, Drawing, Sculpture, Ceramics
- Website: thierry-veltman.nl

Thierry Veltman (16 December 16, 1939 – July 2023) was a Dutch painter, sculptor, ceramist, graphic artist and art educator. He focused in particular on figures and still life.

== Early life and education ==
Thierry Veltman was born in Bussum. He won his first art prize at the age of 12, at an international exhibition of children's drawings in Brazil. In 1958, when he was 19, he exhibited his own interpretations of the Suriname rainforest. Another Paramaribo exhibition followed in 1960.

Veltman went on to study at the Gerrit Rietveld Academie in Amsterdam. Spending time during his youth in South America remained a lifelong source of inspiration.

== Career ==
From the early 1960s, Veltman exhibited extensively at art galleries in the Netherlands and sometimes beyond. Veltman used many drawing and painting techniques, often in mixtures. He was also active in sculpting, ceramics and art research. A 1975 major exhibition of his work in Apeldoorn was opened by Veltman's friend, the native-Dordrecht poet C. Buddingh'.

Veltman taught many students painting and drawing, both in Dordrecht and at Ichthus College in Rotterdam. At Ichthus he founded the department of Art and Communication. Veltman wrote the art education book "Individuality and drawing" (1978; in Dutch).

== Personal ==
Since 1966 he lived mostly in Dordrecht, with a short interlude in Amerongen.

Thierry Veltman died in July 2023. He was survived by his wife Eelke.

== Bibliography ==
=== About the artist ===
- 1974: Louis Schrikkel, schilderijen; Thierry Veltman, schilderijen; Anneke Gladdines, tekeningen. Breda: Cultureel Centrum De Beyerd (catalogue)
- 1975: Thierry Veltman: schilderijen, tekeningen en etsen [Paintings, drawings and etchings]. Apeldoorn: Gemeentelijke Van Reekum Galerij (catalogue)

=== By the artist ===
- 1978: Individualiteit en het tekenen [Individuality and drawing]. Zutphen: Thieme (ISBN 90-03-43900-1)
- 1985: De gouden ploeg; Troost 75 jaar. Spijkenisse: Troost Pernis Group.
