= Design Academy Eindhoven =

Art school in Eindhoven, Netherlands

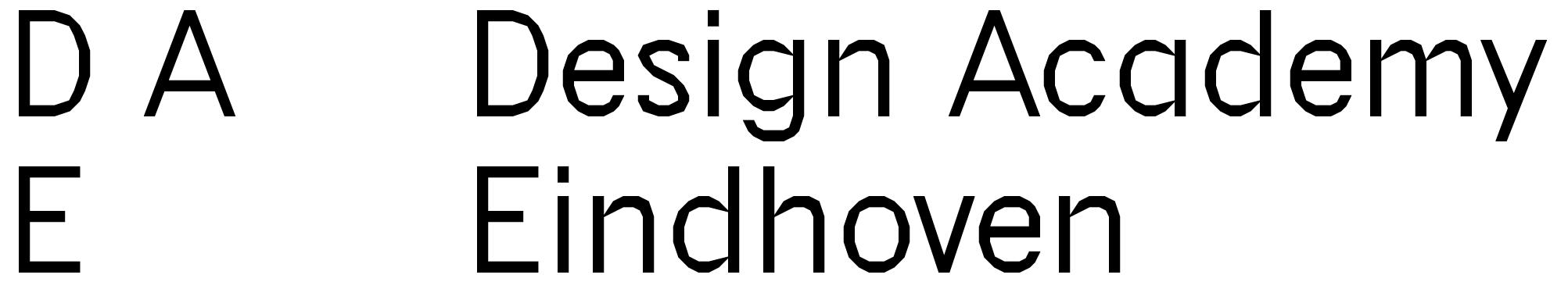
- Type: Public art and design school
- Established: 1947 – Academie voor Industriële Vormgeving; 1999 – Design Academy Eindhoven
- Students: 700
- Location: Eindhoven, Netherlands
- Campus: Urban
- Website: designacademy.nl

Design Academy Eindhoven (DAE) is an interdisciplinary educational institute for art, architecture and design in Eindhoven, Netherlands. The work of its faculty and alumni have brought it international recognition.

== History ==
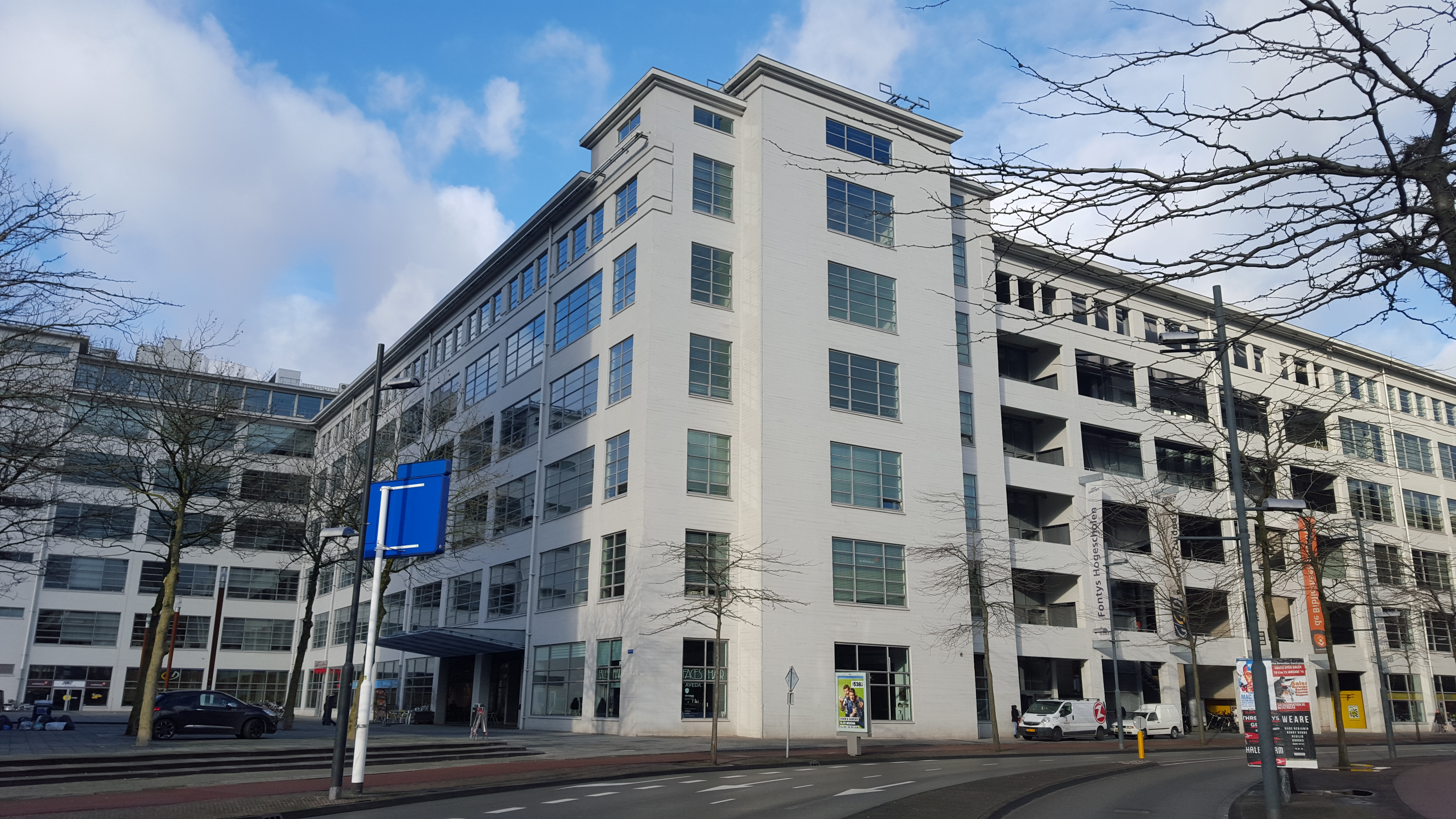
De Witte Dame Campus

The Design Academy Eindhoven was established in 1947 and was originally named the Academie voor Industriële Vormgeving (AIVE). The first nine students graduated in 1955. In 1997, the Academy moved into the Witte Dame building and changed its name to Design Academy Eindhoven (DAE).

In 1999, Li Edelkoort was elected chairwoman of the Academy. Graduation ceremonies were brought back from Amsterdam to Eindhoven. In 2009 she left the Design Academy to pursue personal projects and was replaced by Anne Mieke Eggenkamp as chair. She was in turn succeeded by Thomas Widdershoven from 2013 until September 2016. Since 2017, Joseph Grima has taken place as CD.

Ilse Crawford and Oscar Peña were heads of bachelor programs from 1999 to 2019.

In 2023, the school announced its plan to move to a new building (Microlab on Strijp-S) by 2027.

== Structure ==
The bachelor's program is split into eight interdisciplinary departments, broadly covering art, architecture, fashion design, graphic design and industrial design. As the structure of the bachelor's program is intended to be flexible, students are free to move between departments and all students graduate with the same degree, a Bachelor of Design.

The DAE also offers five distinct master's programs: MA Contextual Design, MA Social Design, MA Information Design, MA Geo-Design and MA the Critical Inquiry Lab (formerly Design Curating and Writing).

In 2024, the Design Academy Eindhoven was placed joint 9th in the art and design subject area in the QS World University Rankings published by Quacquarelli Symonds, with an overall score of 82.2/100.

== Events ==
Every year, in the fall, the Dutch Design Week is held in Eindhoven with an array of Design-related events. These include the graduation exhibit (featuring the works of that year's graduates of the DAE) and the Dutch Design Awards.

== Associated people ==
=== Faculty ===
- Gijs Bakker
- Jan Boelen
- Kees Bol
- Ilse Crawford
- Jan Gregoor
- Catelijne van Middelkoop
- Marina Otero
- Satyendra Pakhale
- Louise Schouwenberg
- Saskia van Stein
- Pieter Stockmans
- The Stone Twins
- Alice Twemlow

=== Alumni ===
- Maarten Baas, designer
- Dror Benshetrit, designer
- Helen Berman, painter
- Joel Blanco, designer
- Matthieu Muller, industrial designer
- Tord Boontje, designer
- Susan Christianen, designer
- Els Coppens-van de Rijt, painter
- Camiel Fortgens, fashion designer
- Dave Hakkens, industrial designer
- Massoud Hassani, designer
- Piet Hein Eek, designer
- Richard Hutten, designer
- Hella Jongerius, designer
- Philippe Malouin, designer
- Sabine Marcelis, artist and designer
- Eugène Peters, artist
- Willy Schmidhamer, artist
- Frans Schrofer, furniture designer
- Job Smeets, artist and designer
- Wieki Somers, designer
- Seungbin Yang, designer
- Umi Dachlan, painter
- Ton van de Ven, creative director
- Marcel Wanders, designer
- Moon Seop Seo, designer
- Isak Berglund, designer
- Tom Gottelier, designer
- Elena Zaghis, designer and art director
