= Kees Bol =

Dutch painter (1916 – 2009)

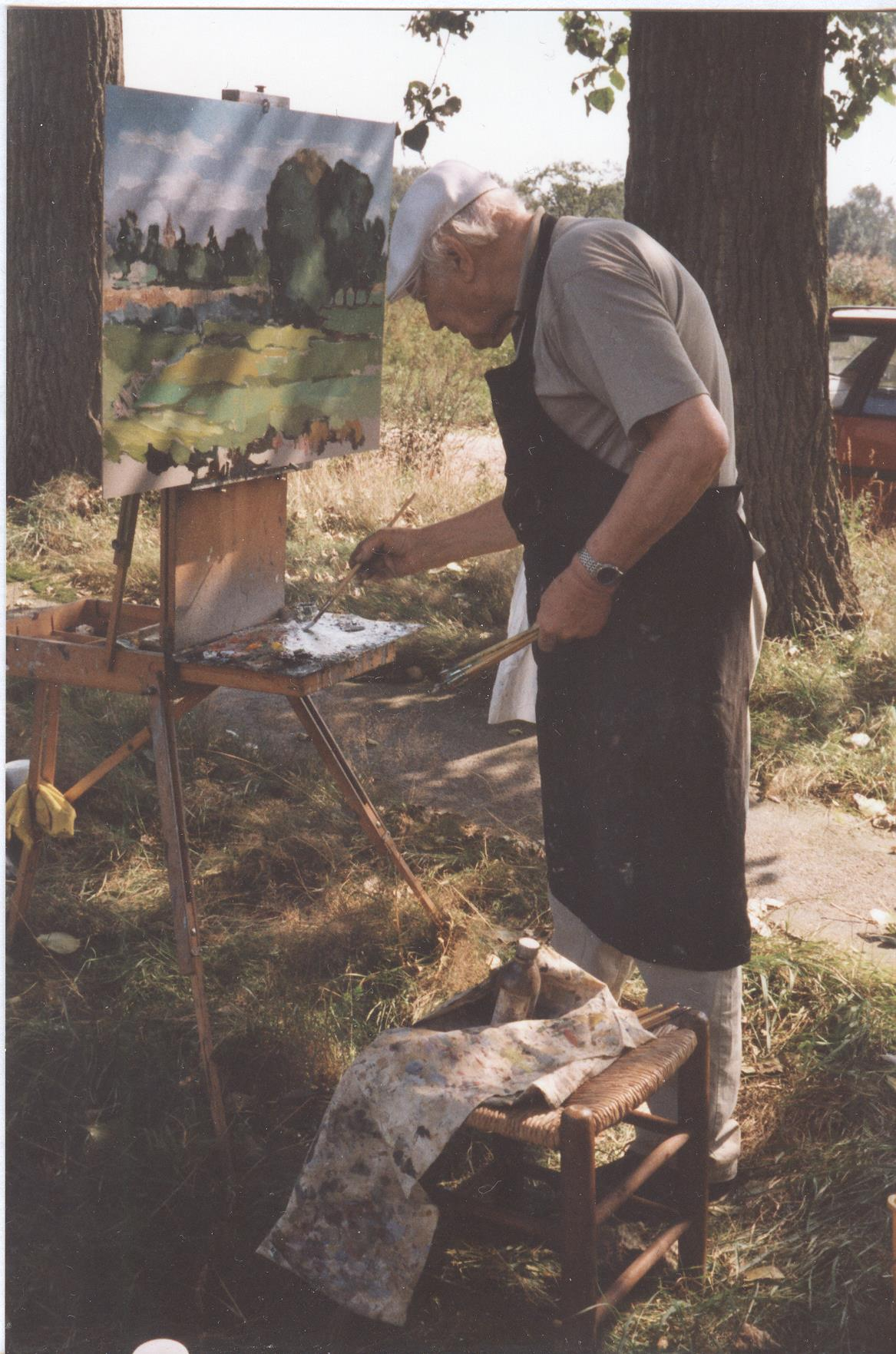
- Born: Cornelis Bol; 21 September 1916; Oegstgeest, Netherlands
- Died: 16 September 2009 (aged 92); Waalwijk, Netherlands
- Known for: Painting, art education

Cornelis "Kees" Bol (21 September 1916 – 16 September 2009) was a Dutch painter and art educator. His work was exhibited in art galleries and museums throughout the Netherlands, as well as in Paris. Bol's work encompassed landscapes, portraits and still life paintings. His style can be described as figurative and expressive, with a specific feeling for tonal quality. In 1950 Bol was awarded the Thérèse van Duyl-Schwartze Prize and in 1982 he was made Knight in the Order of the Netherlands Lion.

== Biography ==
Bol was born in Oegstgeest. Initially he was a florist in his home town. After moving to Eindhoven in 1935, he held corporate jobs at Bata Shoes and Philips. In 1941 he married Toos van 't Hof. During the second world war he turned to art, first studying with Jan Heesters and later on at the Royal Academy of Art in The Hague with Paul Citroen, Han van Dam and Henk Meijer. In 1947 he moved to Tongelre, Eindhoven where he worked as a painter and taught at the Design Academy Eindhoven which he helped set up. Around that time Bol shared a studio with René Smeets, the first chair of the Design Academy Eindhoven.

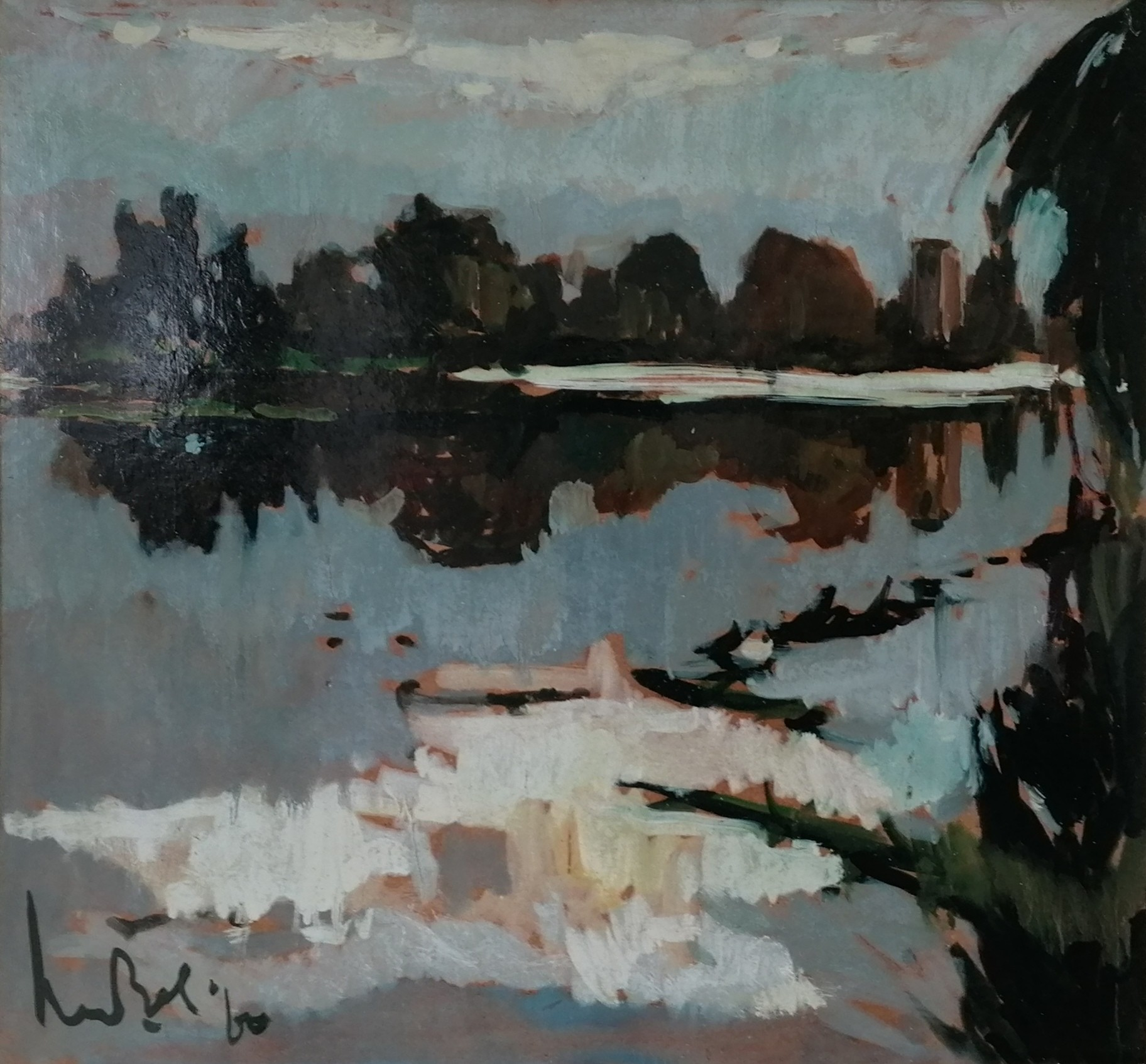
Flooded land near Nederwetten. Kees Bol 1960

In 1970 he moved to Heusden. He also spent considerable time painting in France, mostly in Lozère.

At the Design Academy Eindhoven, back at the Royal Academy of Art and in his studio Bol educated scores of art students, among whom Helen Berman, Frans Clement, Els Coppens-van de Rijt, Frank Dekkers, Frank Letterie, Har Sanders, and Hans van Vroonhoven. Two of his sons, Henri (1945-2000) and Peter (1947-2024), have also become accomplished visual artists.

Opposite what had been his home and studio from 1947 in Eindhoven, a park was named in his honor. This park contains Bol's bust. On 7 October 1991 the Dutch broadcaster NCRV aired a special about the painter.

== Bibliography ==
- Bol, Willemijn (2025) Kees Bol Portretten van Henri. Heusden: Het Blaauw Laaken Kunstkabinet, ISBN 9789090408873.
- Thoben, Peter (2022) Opgroeien tussen kunstenaars en kunst. Het kunstklimaat in Eindhoven ten tijde van Kees Bol, 1935-1970, pp. 73-95, in: Bol, Willemijn, Van Engen, Hildo, Thoben, Peter (2022) Henri Bol. De leefwereld van een Brabantse fijnschilder. Heusden: Het Gouverneurshuis, Het Blaauw Laaken, ISBN 9789090360287
- Bol, Peter en Henriëtte Verburgh (2005) Kees Bol. Kees Bol Foundation.
- Verburgh, Henriëtte (2001) Kees Bol: portretten van Toos. Wijk: Pictures Publishers, ISBN 90-73187-39-7.
- Beks, Maarten (1991) Kees Bol: 1974-1991. Hapert: De Kempen Pers, ISBN 90-70427-81-8.
- Tegenbosch, Lambert (1984) Het waterschap van Kees Bol. Kunsthandel Lambert Tegenbosch, Amsterdam/Heusden
- Puijenbroek, Frans van en Lambert Tegenbosch (1976). Kees Bol. Eindhoven: Stedelijk Van Abbemuseum.
- Wessem, Jan N. van (1957) Kees Bol. Leiden: De Lakenhal.
