= 2007 in architecture =

The year 2007 in architecture involved some significant architectural events and new buildings.

== Events ==
- May 30 – The Saitta House at Dyker Heights, Brooklyn, New York built in 1899 is added to the National Register of Historic Places.
- June 26 – The Museum of the History of Polish Jews groundbreaking ceremony is held in Warsaw. The building is completed in 2013.
- July 21 – Construction of Burj Khalifa surpasses the height of Taipei 101 (510 m) to become the tallest building in the world at 818m.

== Buildings and structures ==
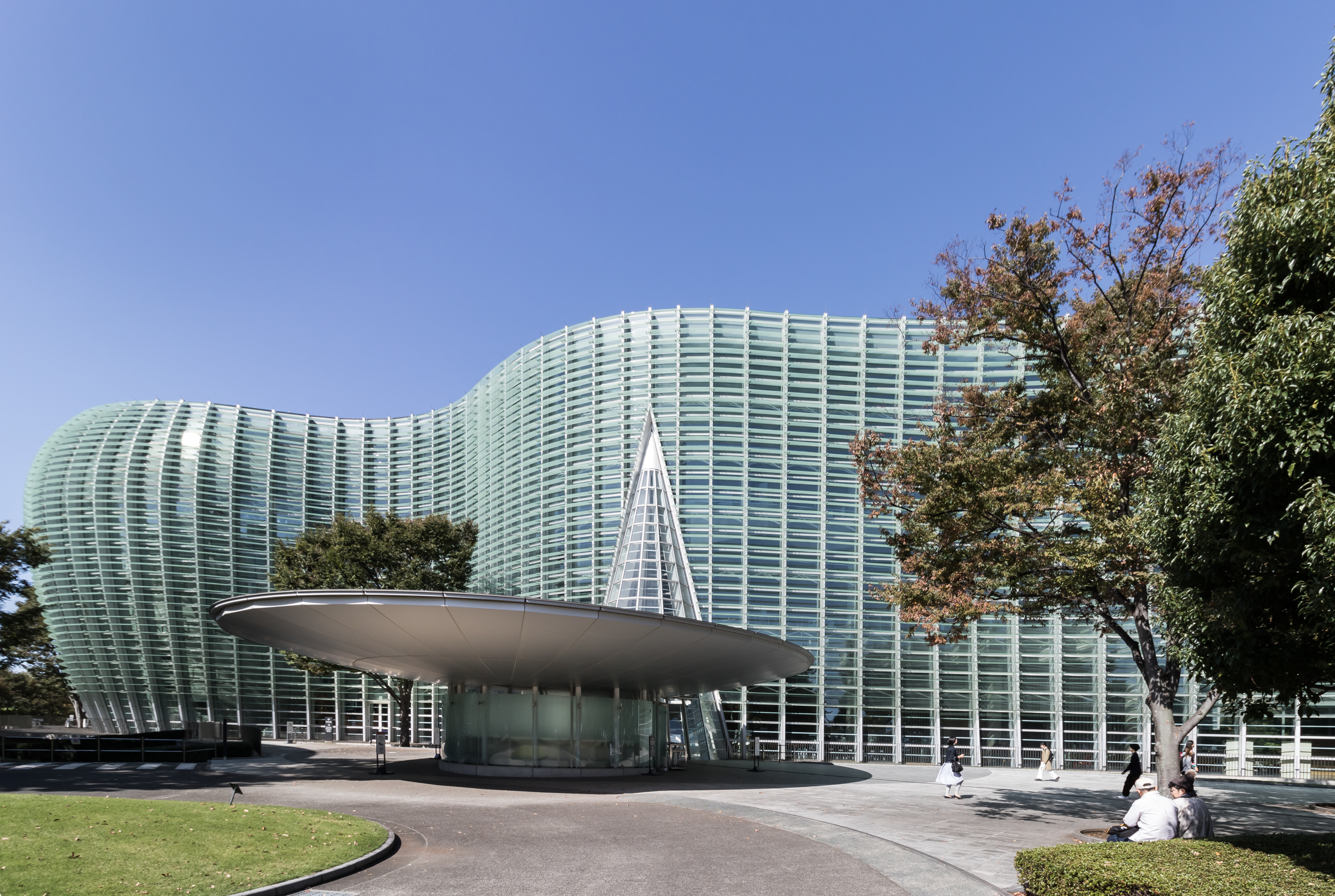
The National Art Center, Tokyo, Japan

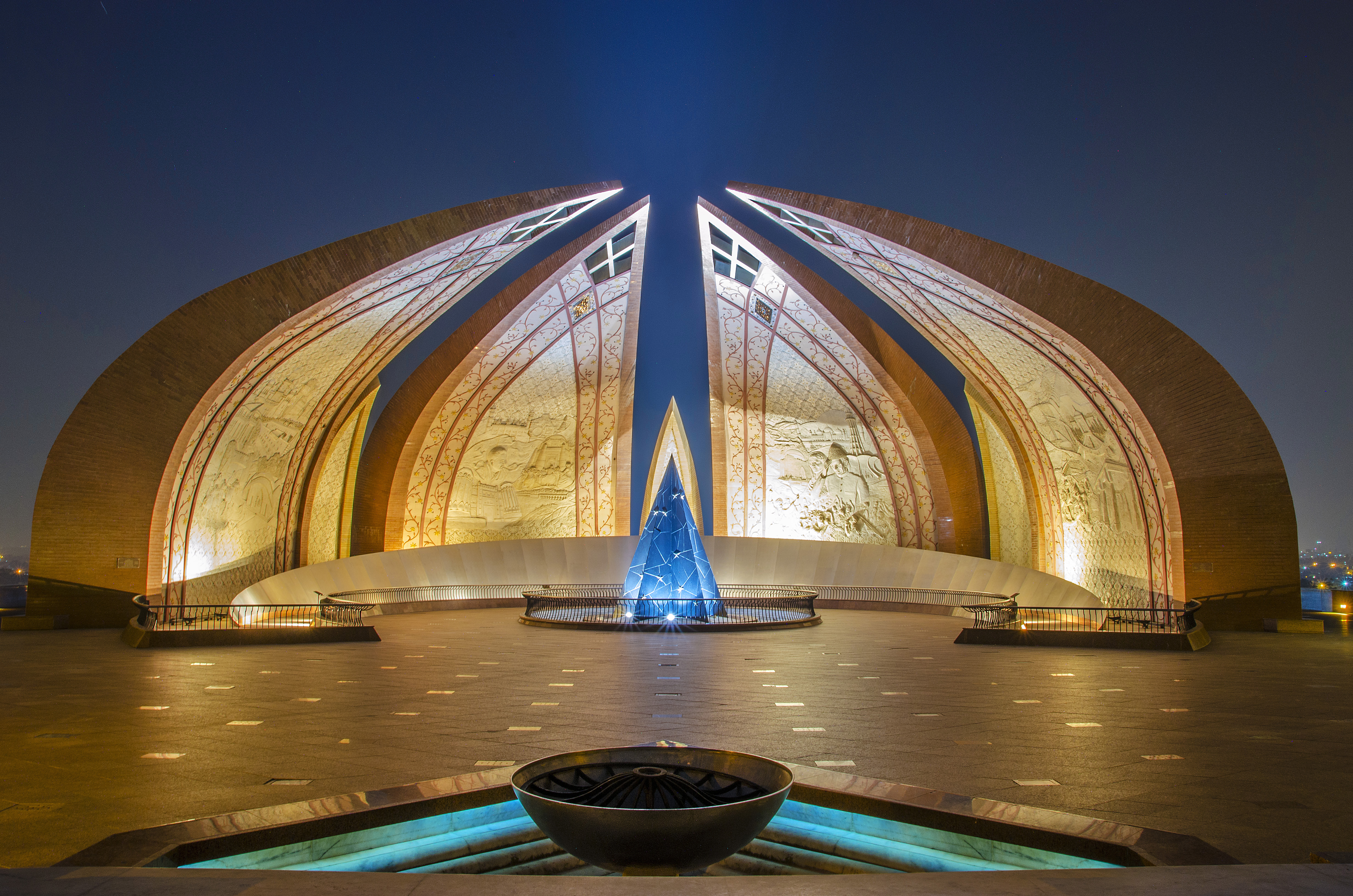
Pakistan Monument in Islamabad, Pakistan

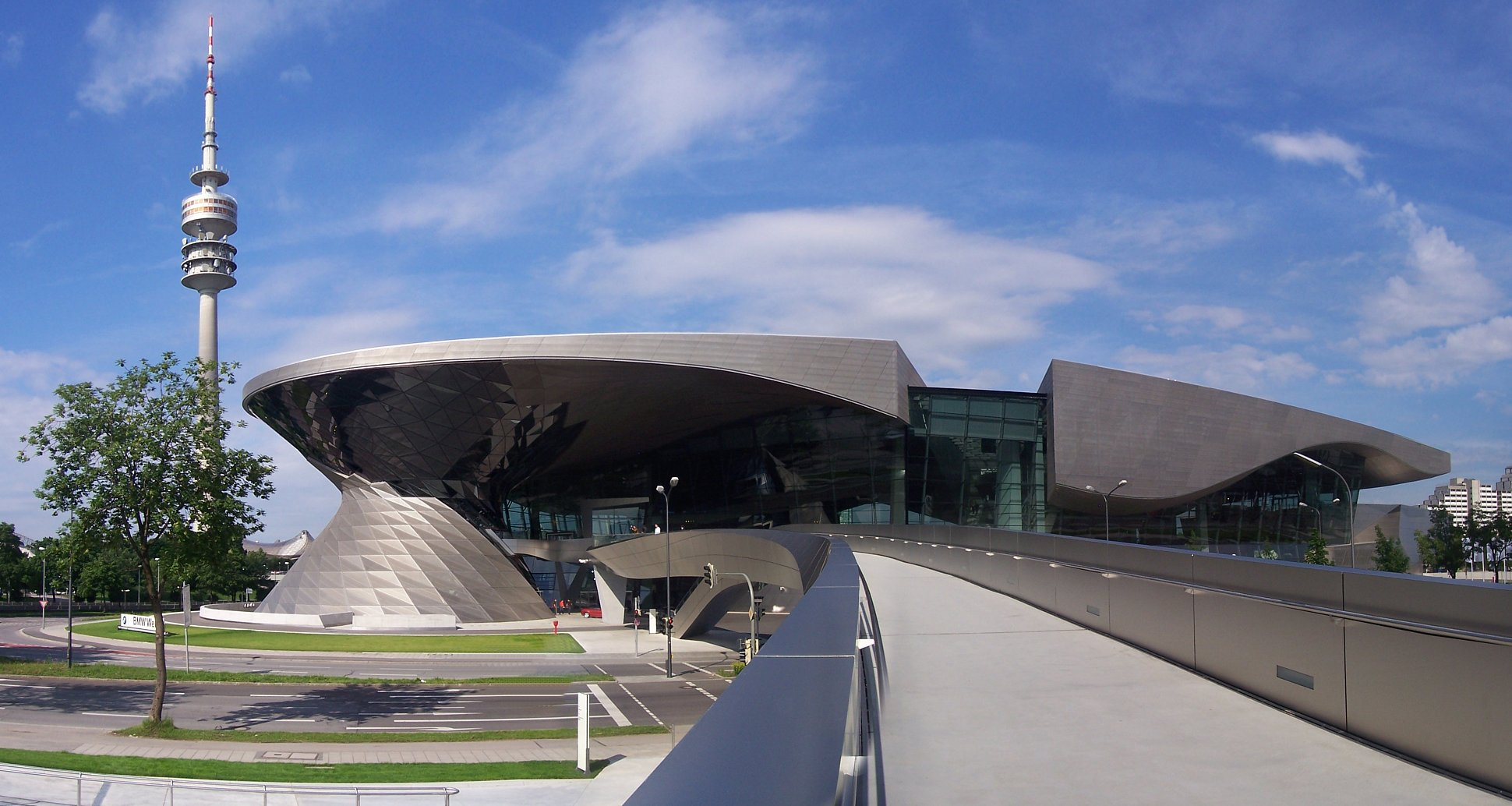
BMW Welt in Munich, Germany

=== Buildings opened ===
- January 20 – Olympic Sculpture Park, Seattle, WA., USA, designed by Weiss/Manfredi.
- January 21 – The National Art Center, Tokyo, designed by Kisho Kurokawa.
- February 28 – San Francisco Federal Building, by Morphosis.
- March 8 – Limoges Concert Hall, France, by Bernard Tschumi Architects.
- March 9 – New Wembley Stadium, London (original stadium demolished in 2002).
- March 23 – Pakistan Monument, Islamabad, designed by Arif Masoud.
- April 25 – IAC/InterActiveCorp headquarters opens in New York, by Gehry Partners.
- May 27 – St Bede's Church, Basingstoke, England (Roman Catholic), designed by Maguire and Murray.
- June 2 – Michael Lee-Chin Crystal at Royal Ontario Museum, Toronto, designed by Daniel Libeskind.
- June 9 – Bloch Building, Nelson-Atkins Museum of Art addition, Kansas City, Mo. by Steven Holl Architects.
- June – Pawilon Wyspiański 2000, Kraków, Poland, by Krzysztof Ingarden.
- June–July – East Beach Cafe, Littlehampton, England, by Thomas Heatherwick.
- August – La Vicaria Arch Bridge in Spain.
- August 9 – Roland Levinsky Building at the University of Plymouth, Devon, England, by Henning Larsen.
- September 16 – Hull Paragon Interchange (railway station reconstruction), Kingston upon Hull, England, designed by WilkinsonEyre.
- October – Museum of Contemporary Art Denver, by David Adjaye.
- October 12 – Armed Forces Memorial, National Memorial Arboretum, Staffordshire, England, by Liam O'Connor Architects and Planning Consultants.
- October 17 – BMW Welt ("BMW World") exhibition facility in Munich, Germany, by Coop Himmelb(l)au.
- November 3 – Digital Beijing Building in China, by Pei Zhu.
- December 1 – The New Museum of Contemporary Art, New York, by SANAA.
- December 10 – Inauguration of Gare de Marseille-Saint-Charles' major reconstruction as a transportation interchange in France.

== Buildings completed ==
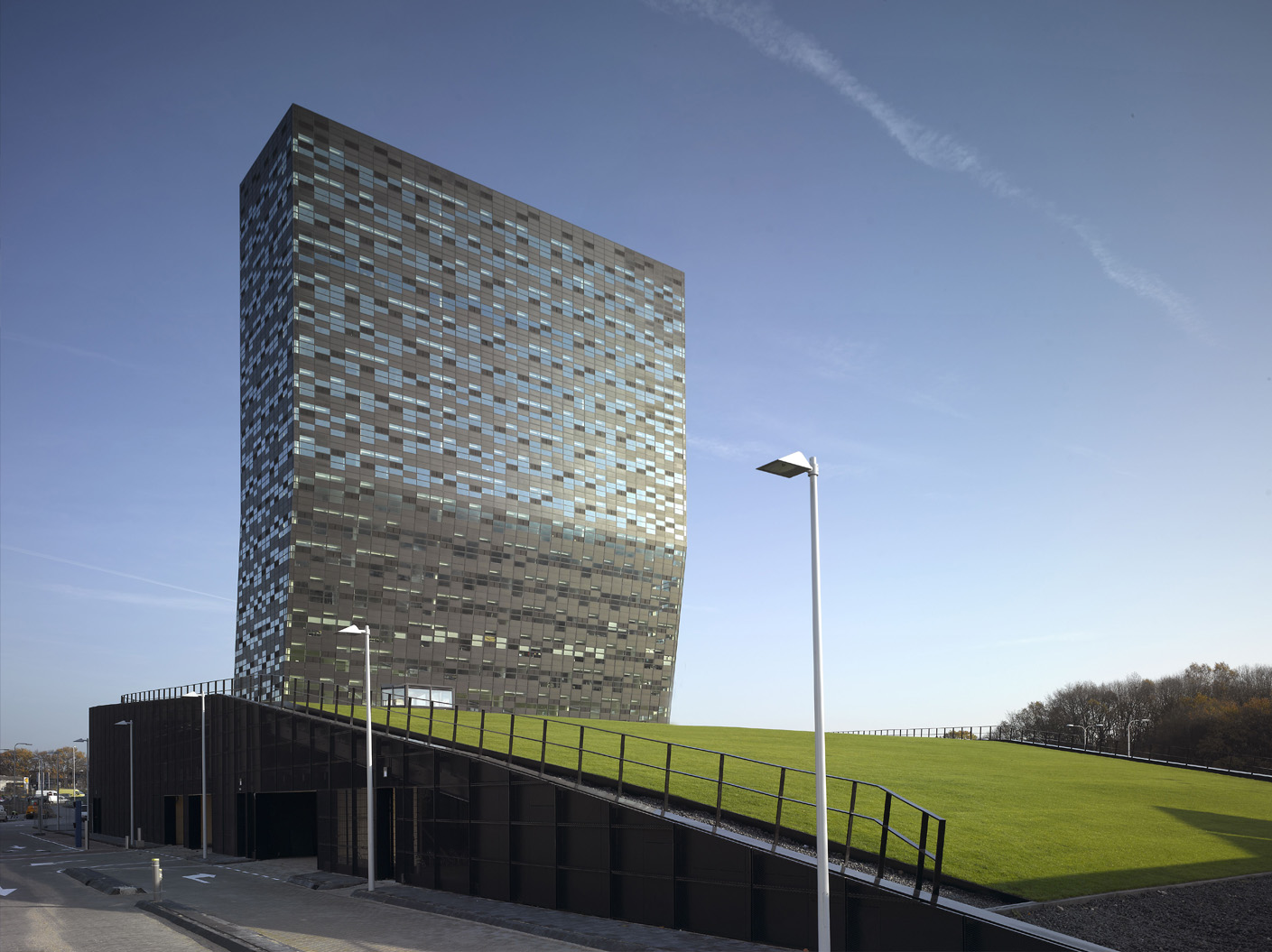
The FiftyTwoDegrees in Nijmegen, Netherlands

- Manchester Civil Justice Centre by Denton Corker Marshall.
- Beetham Tower, Manchester by Ian Simpson.
- Calgary Courts Centre in Calgary, Alberta
- Kolumba (diocesan art museum) in Cologne, Germany, designed by Peter Zumthor.
- Tama Art University Library, Hachiōji campus in Tokyo, designed by Toyo Ito.
- Wachendorf-Feldkapelle-Bruder-Klaus, Germany, designed by Peter Zumthor.
- FiftyTwoDegrees in Nijmegen, designed by Mecanoo.
- Fontana Boathouse, West Side Rowing Club, Buffalo, New York, based on a 1905 plan by Frank Lloyd Wright.
- The Lighthouse, Watford, Britain's first zero-carbon house, designed by Sheppard Robson.
- Albury Library Museum, designed by Ashton Raggatt McDougall in Albury, New South Wales, Australia.
- Sunken House, De Beauvoir Town, north London, designed by David Adjaye.

== Exhibitions ==
- Arch Moscow

== Awards ==
- AIA Gold Medal – Edward Larrabee Barnes
- Architecture Firm Award – Leers Weinzapfel Associates Architects
- BNA Building of the Year (nl) - Vesteda Tower
- Driehaus Architecture Prize – Jaquelin T. Robertson
- Emporis Skyscraper Award – Het Strijkijzer
- European Union Prize for Contemporary Architecture (Mies van der Rohe Prize) – Mansilla+Tuñón Arquitectos for Contemporary Art Museum of Castilla y León
- Grand Prix de l'urbanisme – Yves Lion
- Mies van der Rohe Prize – Mansilla+Tuñón Arquitectos for the MUSAC in León, Spain
- Praemium Imperiale Architecture Award – Herzog & de Meuron
- Pritzker Prize – Richard Rogers
- RAIA Gold Medal – Enrico Taglietti
- RIBA Royal Gold Medal – Herzog & de Meuron
- Stirling Prize – David Chipperfield Architects for the Museum of Modern Literature in Marbach am Neckar
- Thomas Jefferson Medal in Architecture – Zaha Hadid
- Twenty-five Year Award – Vietnam Veterans Memorial
- Vincent Scully Prize – Witold Rybczynski

== Deaths ==
- May 14 – Sir Colin St John Wilson, English architect (born 1922)
- June 26 – Lucien Hervé, French architectural photographer (born 1910)
- June 20 – Margaret Helfand, American architect and urban planner based in Manhattan (born 1947; colon cancer)
- August 11 – Wolf Hilbertz, German-born futurist architect, inventor and marine scientist (born 1938)
- September 30 – Oswald Mathias Ungers, German rationalist architect and architectural theorist (born 1926)
- October 12 – Kisho Noriaki Kurokawa, Japanese architect and co-founder of the Metabolist Movement (born 1934)
- October 21 – Jorge Arango, Colombian-born American minimalist architect (born 1917)

== See also ==
- Timeline of architecture
