= Porthos (disambiguation) =

Porthos is a fictional musketeer.

Porthos may also refer to:

- Porthos (building), an apartment building in the Dutch city Eindhoven
- Porthos (Star Trek), a fictional dog in Star Trek
- Seawise Giant, the longest ship ever built, called Porthos at one point

== See also ==
- Porthos Range, a mountain range in Antarctica
