= Lighthouse (Eindhoven) =

Skyscraper in Eindhoven, Netherlands

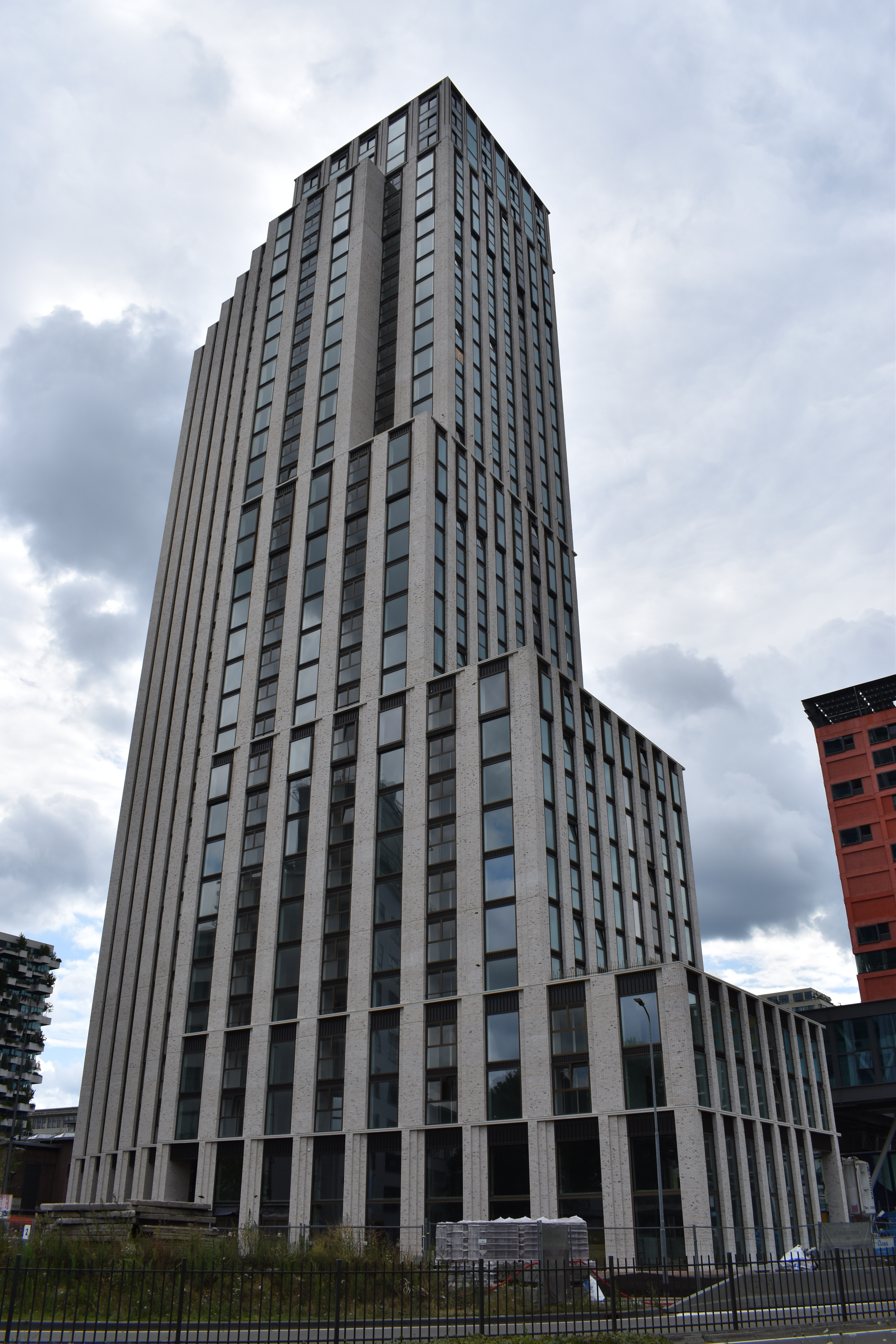
- Interactive map of the Lighthouse area

General information
- Status: Completed
- Type: Residential
- Location: Machinekamerplein 38, Eindhoven, Netherlands
- Coordinates: 51.44888°N 5.45591°E
- Construction started: 2022
- Completed: 2025

Height
- Roof: 109 m (358 ft)

Technical details
- Structural system: Reinforced concrete
- Floor count: 34

Design and construction
- Architect: De Zwarte Hond
- Developer: SDK Vastgoed
- Main contractor: Stam + De Koning Bouw, Visser & Smit Bouw

The Lighthouse also known as Niko Tower or Woontoren N is a high-rise residential building in the Strijp-S district of Eindhoven, Netherlands. Built between 2022 and 2025, the tower stands at 109 m (358 ft) with 34 floors and is the tallest building in Eindhoven as well as the 30th tallest in the Netherlands.

== History ==
The building's design references the work of architect Dirk Roosenburg, who designed many older buildings in Strijp-S neighbourhood. The regular vertical division ensures that the building has a consistent and uncluttered appearance, with all elements well connected. Furthermore, the building's varying heights align with the heights of surrounding buildings in the immediate vicinity. It relates to the Klokgebouw, Strijp-T and the Machinekamerplein, which is yet to be developed. The facade of the residential tower is clad with gray and white bricks and golden-yellow aluminum window frames . The tower's length is emphasized by the use of vertical windows and lines.

The tower houses 333 private sector rental apartments, ranging in size from 40 to 110 m². Three larger penthouses have also been built. The ground floor is reserved for shops, restaurants, offices, cultural concepts, and other amenities. There is also a bicycle storage facility beneath the tower, and trees have been planted in the surrounding area.

In July 2024, the Lighthouse tower reached its highest point as it was architecturally topped out. This meant that the De Admirant residential tower was no longer the tallest building in Eindhoven after fifteen years. The tower was inaugurated on October 2, 2025.

== Construction site ==
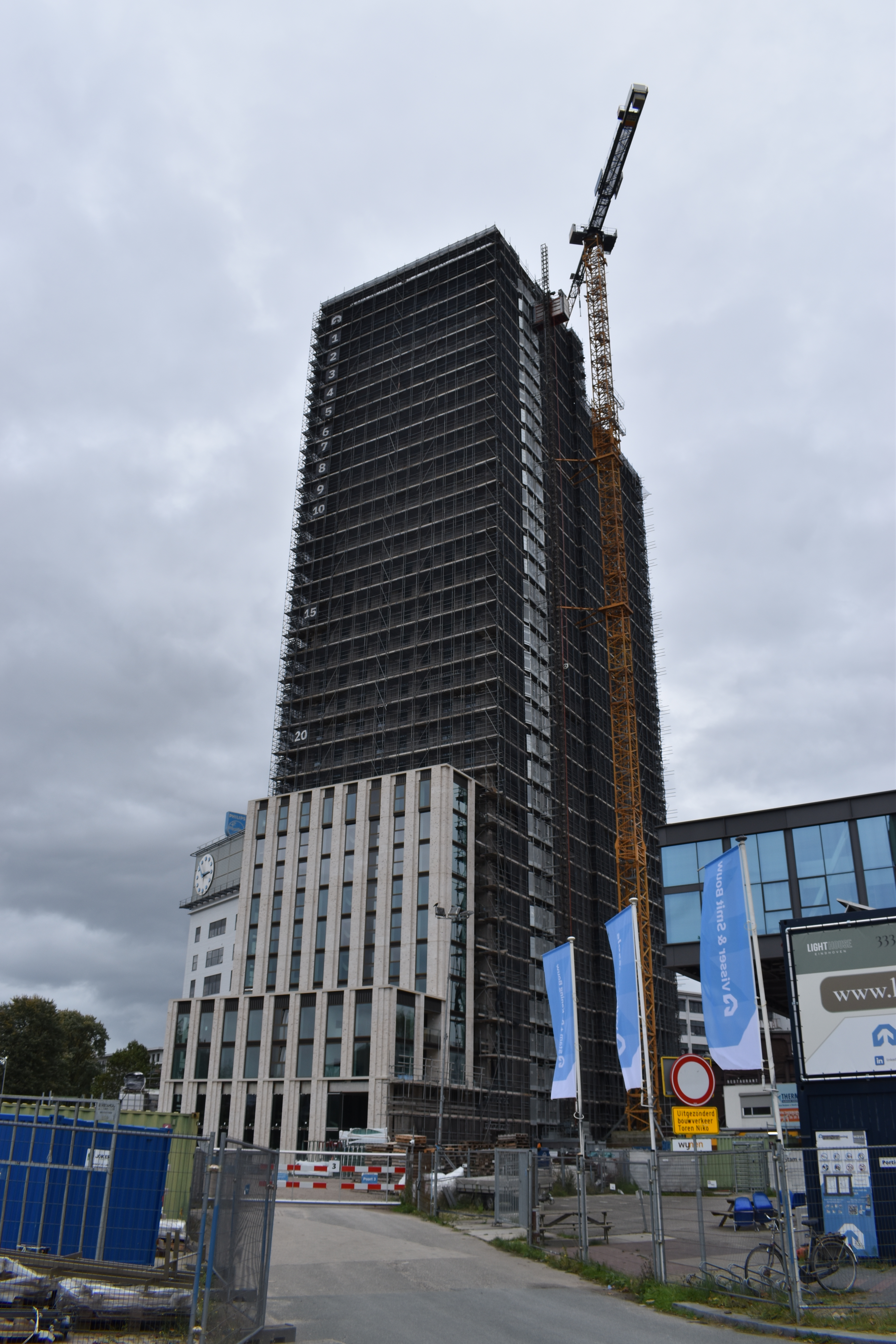
The tower in October 2024...

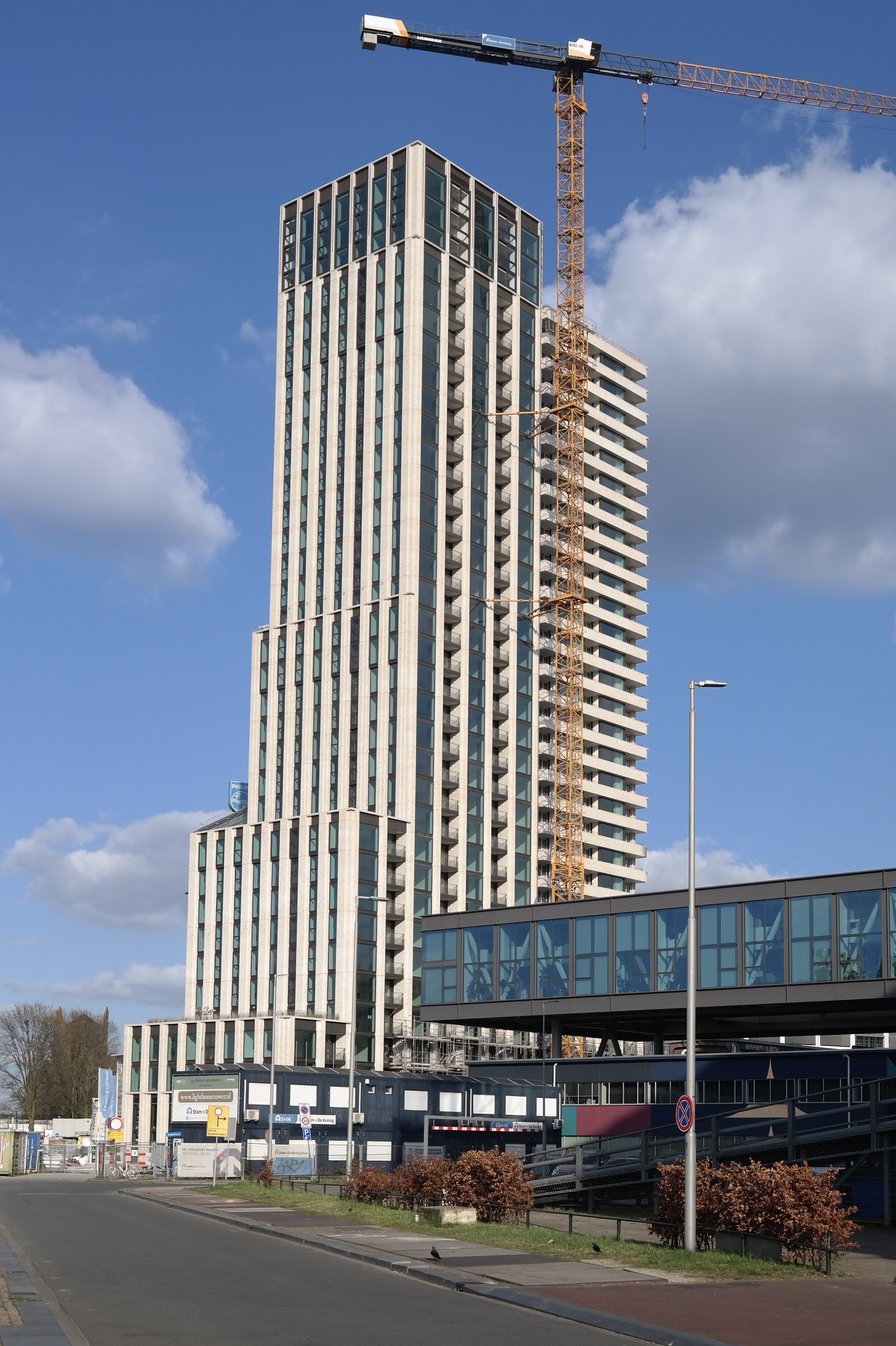
...and March 2025

== See also ==
- List of tallest buildings in Eindhoven
- List of tallest buildings in the Netherlands
