= List of tallest buildings in Eindhoven =

Skyline of Eindhoven
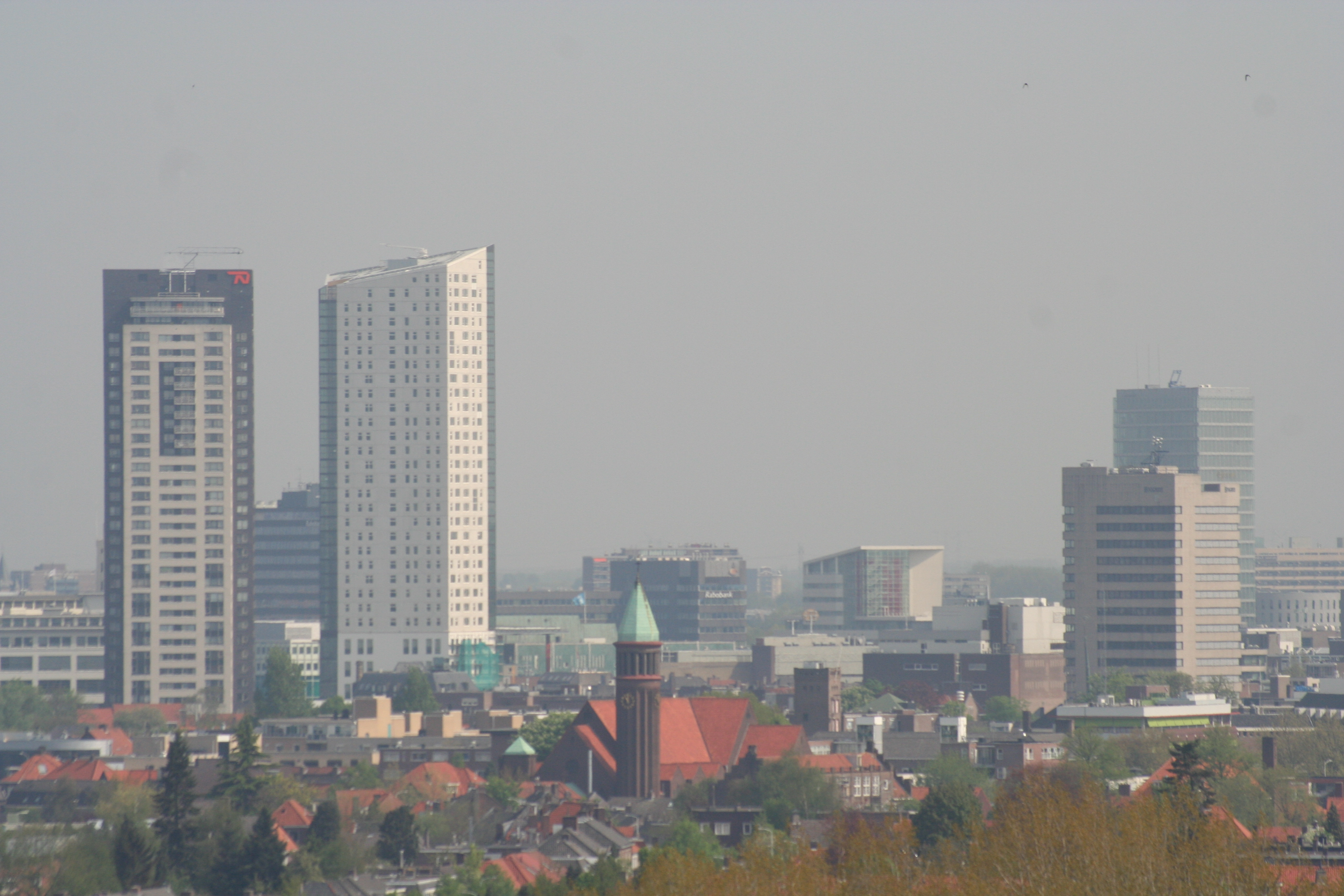
- Eindhoven in 2006
- Tallest building: Lighthouse (2025)
- Tallest building height: 109 m (358 ft)

Number of tall buildings (2026)
- Taller than 75 m (246 ft): 14
- Taller than 100 m (328 ft): 5

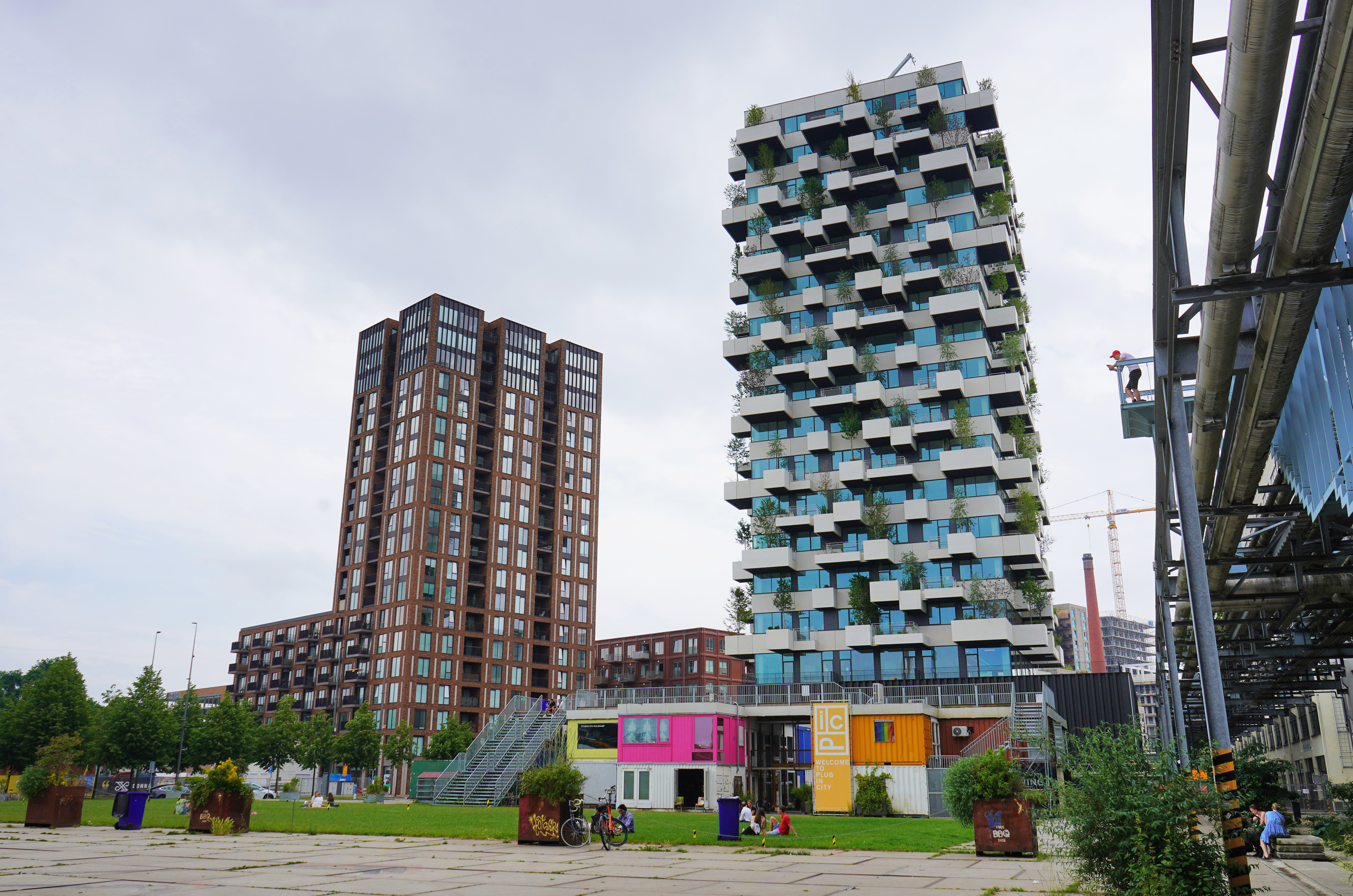
New developments in the Strijp-S neighborhood in 2021

Eindhoven is the fifth-largest city in the Netherlands and the largest outside of the Randstad conurbation, with a population of around 250,000 of 2025. The tallest building in Eindhoven is Lighthouse, a 109 m (358 ft), 34-storey residential tower completed in 2025 in Strijp-S. Eindhoven is home to over a hundred high-rise structures; 14 of them stand taller than 75 m (246 ft), with five reaching over 100 m (328 ft) in height, the fourth-most of any Dutch city after Rotterdam, Amsterdam, and The Hague.

Tall high-rises in Eindhoven are a relatively recent phenomenon. For most of the late 20th century, the tallest multistorey building in Eindhoven was Boschdijk 525, a 15-storey office tower built in 1964. It served as the headquarters for Dutch technology company Philips until the company moved its head offices to Amsterdam in 1997. Boschdijk 525 was surpassed by De Regent, a 96 m (315 ft), 32-story residential tower, in 1999. With the exception of De Regent, every building taller than 75 m (246 ft) in Eindhoven were built after 2000. In the 2000s, both De Admirant and Porthos overtook De Regent and became the city's two tallest buildings.

In the 2020s, Eindhoven's skyline is undergoing significant growth. Tall buildings are seen as a response to a housing shortage, as the city has attracted new residents due to its tech industry. Local planning regulations were relaxed to allow towers higher than 105 m (344 ft) in 2019. Two residential high-rises have since surpassed De Admirant in height: Bunker Tower in 2022, and Lighthouse in 2025. The District E project is a proposed development that would see the fruition of a high-rise nearly 150 m (492 ft) in height, while another proposal, The Dutch Mountains, would become the tallest wooden building in the world at a height of over 130 m (427 ft) if built.

Most of Eindhoven's tallest buildings are located in the city centre, particularly in the Centrum area and the Strijp-S neighborhood, which was a former industrial park belonging to Philips.

== History ==
Number of buildings by height in Eindhoven by the end of each year, based on the information in this article. Click on the legend to toggle a specific height on or off. View chart definition.

== Map of tallest buildings ==
This map displays the location of all buildings taller than 75 m (246 ft) in Eindhoven. Each marker is numbered by the building's height rank, and coloured by the decade of its completion.

Buildings taller than 75 m (246 ft) in Eindhoven.
- 1990s
- 2000s
- 2010s
- 2020s
1 Lighthouse
2 Bunker Tower
3 De Admirant
4 Eurostaete
5 Porthos
6 De Regent
7 Vestedatoren
8 Kennedy Toren
9 Onyx
10 Trudo Vertical Forest
11 Lichthoven
12 Hartje New York
13 Meerzicht
14 NEXT

== Cityscape ==
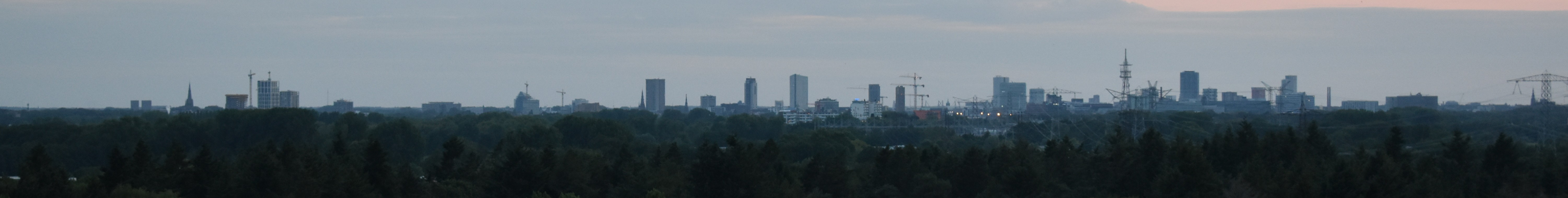
Eindhoven from the Gulbergen golf course in 2025

== Tallest buildings ==
This list ranks completed buildings in Eindhoven that stand at least 75 m (246 ft) tall as of 2026, based on standard height measurement. This includes spires and architectural details but does not include antenna masts. The “Year” column indicates the year of completion. Buildings tied in height are sorted by year of completion with earlier buildings ranked first, and then alphabetically.

Was the tallest building in Eindhoven upon completion

Rank	Name	Image	Location	Height m (ft)	Floors	Year	Purpose	Notes
1	Lighthouse		51°26′56″N 5°27′22″E	109 (358)	34	2025	Residential	Also known as Niko. Tallest building in Eindhoven since 2025. Tallest building completed in Eindhoven in the 2020s. The building's design references the work of architect Dirk Roosenburg, who designed many older buildings in Strijp-S neighbourhood.
2	Bunker Tower		51°26′50″N 5°28′47″E	105.7 (347)	32	2022	Residential	Tallest building in Eindhoven from 2022 to 2025. The tower is built on a brutalist bunker building designed by Hugh Maaskant (hence the name Bunk Tower, or Bunkertoren, for the high-rise). The bunker is part of the Eindhoven University of Technology and was a social hub for students.
3	De Admirant		51°26′22″N 5°28′32″E	105 (344)	31	2006	Residential	Tallest building in Eindhoven from 2006 to 2022. Tallest building completed in Eindhoven in the 2000s. Part of the Rond de Admirant project, which also involved the construction of the Blob.
4	Eurostaete		51°26′35″N 5°27′57″E	102 (335)	31	2025	Residential	Located next to Philips Stadium, and part of the redevelopment of Eindhoven’s Stadium Quarter.
5	Porthos		51°28′04″N 5°28′29″E	101 (331)	32	2006	Residential	Developed by ING Real Estate Development as part of the renovation of the Woensel shopping centre. Three towers were built, each named for one of the Three Musketeers, with the tower named after Porthos.
6	De Regent		51°26′19″N 5°28′28″E	96 (315)	32	1999	Residential	Tallest building in Eindhoven from 1999 to 2006. Tallest building completed in Eindhoven in the 1990s. The first building with over 30 stories in Eindhoven.
7	Vestedatoren		51°26′15″N 5°28′56″E	90 (295)	28	2006	Residential	The shape of the tower resembles that of the Flatiron Building in New York City.
8	Kennedy Toren		51°26′38″N 5°28′50″E	83 (272)	21	2003	Office	Tallest office building in Eindhoven. Located next to Eindhoven Centraal railway station.
9	Onyx		51°26′27″N 5°28′22″E	83 (272)	25	2019	Residential	
10	Trudo Vertical Forest		51°26′49″N 5°27′30″E	76.6 (251)	19	2021	Residential	First "Vertical Forest" high-rise in the Netherlands and the first such building for social housing. Similar to Bosco Verticale in Milan, the building has trees and shrubs planted on its balconies.
11	Lichthoven		51°26′31″N 5°28′52″E	76.2 (250)	23	2016	Residential	Also known as The Student Hotel. The building is used for student housing, mainly for students attending the Eindhoven University of Technology.
12	Hartje New York		51°26′37″N 5°27′51″E	75 (246)	22	2013	Residential	
13	Meerzicht		51°26′33″N 5°24′26″E	75 (246)	24	2020	Residential	Tallest building in Meerhoven in western Eindhoven. Part of the new Meerrijk development.
14	NEXT		51°26′45″N 5°27′42″E	75 (246)	24	2022	Residential	Consists of three sections with varying heights, with a two-story penthouse on the upper floors.

== Tallest under construction or proposed ==
=== Under construction ===
The following table includes buildings under construction in Eindhoven that are planned to be at least 75 m (246 ft) tall as of 2026, based on standard height measurement. The “Year” column indicates the expected year of completion. Buildings that are on hold are not included.

Name	Height m (ft)	Floors	Year	Purpose	Notes
Victoriatoren	92 (302)	27	2026	Residential	
Lightyards - Highlight	78.1 (256)	24	2026	Residential	

=== Proposed ===
The following table includes approved and proposed buildings in Eindhoven that are planned to be at least 75 m (246 ft) tall as of 2026, based on standard height measurement. The “Year” column indicates the expected year of completion. Buildings that are on hold are not included.

Name	Height m (ft)	Floors	Year	Purpose	Notes
District E West Tower	148 (486)	45	2028	Mixed-use	
The Dutch Mountains (Tower 1)	130.9 (429)	39	2020	Mixed-use	
VMDA 1	122 (400)	38	2030	Mixed-use	
District E East Tower	113.9 (374)	34	2028	Mixed-use	
Brightlight Towers	111.7 (366)	34	2030	Residential	
The Four	110 (361)	34	2030	Residential	
Stadhuispleintoren	105 (344)	32	–	Residential	
The Dutch Mountains (Tower 2)	101.5 (333)	27	2030	Mixed-use	
De Sierlijke Dames 1	78 (256)	25	2028	Residential	
De Sierlijke Dames 2	78 (256)	25	2028	Residential	
District E South Tower	76.3 (250)	22	2028	Mixed-use	
De Nieuwe Eindhoven	75 (246)	22	2027	Residential	

== Timeline of tallest buildings ==
This lists buildings that once held the title of the tallest building in Eindhoven.

Name	Image	Years as tallest	Height m (ft)	Floors	References
Boschdijk 525		1964–1999	66 (217)	15	Also known as Philips Nederland.
De Regent		1999–2006	96 (315)	32	
De Admirant		2006–2022	105 (344)	31	
Bunker Tower		2022–2025	105.7 (347)	32	
Lighthouse		2025–present	109 (358)	34	

== See also ==
- List of tallest buildings in the Netherlands
- List of tallest buildings in Amsterdam
- List of tallest buildings in Rotterdam
- List of tallest buildings in The Hague
- List of tallest buildings in Utrecht
