= Jo Coenen =

Dutch architect and urban planner

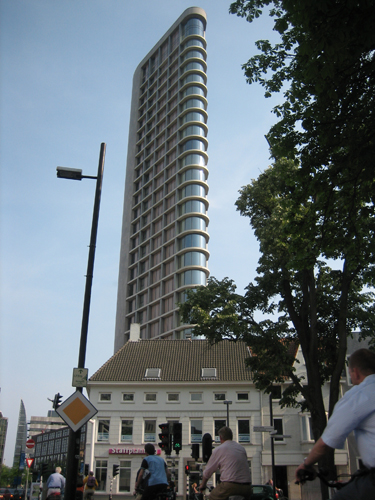
The Vesteda Tower in Eindhoven

Jo Coenen (born 30 September 1949 in Heerlen) is a Dutch architect and urban planner. He studied architecture at the Eindhoven University of Technology (graduating in 1975), and later held professorships at TU Karlsruhe, Eindhoven University of Technology and Delft University of Technology.

Between 2000 and 2004 Coenen was Chief Government Architect of the Netherlands (Rijksbouwmeester). In 1995 he won the BNA Kubus award. He is an honorary member of the Association of German Architects (BDA).

== Work ==
Coenen's professional career started off with relatively small scale architectural projects, the majority of which were in the south of the Netherlands. This includes the public library in Heerlen (1983-1986), the city hall of Delft (1984-1986) and a bank in Venlo (1984-1987). His reputation began to grow with larger scale urban design work, including the area around the Vaillantlaan in The Hague, the KSNM island in Amsterdam, the Céramique residential area in central Maastricht and the Maas-Marktproject, also in Maastricht. The large scale and complexity of these projects also helped develop his international reputation.

Other larger projects designed by Coenen include The Dutch Architecture Institute (originally called the Het Nieuwe Instituut) in the Museumpark of Rotterdam (1988–1993), the Smalle Haven area in Eindhoven (which includes the construction of the Vestedatoren, 2000–2006) en the Innovatoren in Venlo (2009-2011). Coenen's office (Jo Coenen Architects and Urbanists of JCAU) was one of the two architectural firms that (the other firm was Network Oriented Architects, NOAHH) worked on the (second) design for the education and cultural complex Amare in the centre of Den Haag (2015-2021). However, this commission was not an easy project and featured conflict with the council in Den Haag.

JCAU-designed buildings are characterised by their awareness of their urban surrounding, with a focus on the public space around the building. They are also characterised by design thinking at a macro and micro level - from the building's overall place in the city, to the furniture within it. Coenen's work is described as being 'friendly monumentalism' and as "literal and figurative heavyweights compared to the 'hip' design trends, ironic distance and radical experiments" of other Dutch architects. Within the Dutch architectural community, Coenen argues for greater understanding and sensitivity of deeper historical patterns in architecture. Both in his urban planning projects and his time as rijksbouwmeester, he has demonstrated a strong preference for Belgian, Swiss and souther European architects. For the development of the KNSM-elsand he worked with Bruno Albert and Diener & Diener, for the Céramique with Bruno Albert, Charles Vandenhove, Bob Van Reeth, Christian Kieckens, Mario Botta, Luigi Snozzi, Aldo Rossi, Cruz y Ortiz, MBM Arquitectes and Álvaro Siza, For the Mosae Forum Bruno Albert was again involved. As rijksbouwmeester he nominated Juan Navarro Baldeweg as the architect for the RCE-gebouw in Amersfoort.

At the end of 2021 Coenen launched, together with the Belgian-Dutch economist and ex rector of the University of Maastricht, Luc Soete, for the partial tunnelling of the main railway tracks in Maastricht. The plan was presented in an exhibition in 2022 at the Centre Céramique. After it gained support from the council in Maastricht, a request went to the ProRail for a feasibility study. After initial negative feedback from ProRail, who considered it too expensive, a second plan was submitted. This proposed a complete tunnelling of the railway lines - the potential exploitation of more ground-level land meant that the project was financially more sustainable.

== Architecture projects ==
- 1986 Library and gallery, Heerlen
- 1986 City Hall, Delft
- 1993 Netherlands Architecture Institute, Rotterdam
- 1997 Emerald Empire (residential), Amsterdam
- 1999 Centre Céramique, Maastricht
- 1999 Q 30 (Gendarmenmarkt), Berlin
- 2002 DOCK, Düsseldorf
- 2003 Renovatie Glaspaleis, Heerlen
- 2006 Vesteda Tower, Eindhoven
- 2007 Mosae Forum, Maastricht
- 2007 Central library Openbare Bibliotheek Amsterdam, Amsterdam
- 2012 Innova Tower, Floriade 2012, Venlo
- under construction Onderwijs- en cultuurcomplex (OCC), The Hague

== Urban planning ==
- 1989 Master plan Vaillantlaan, The Hague
- 1990 Master plan KNSM Island, Amsterdam
- 1991 Master plan Céramique, Maastricht
- 2005 Master plan Arts Cluster, Tilburg
- 2006 Master plan Belval, Luxembourg
- 2019 Master plan Leidsche Rijn Centrum, Utrecht
- developing Master plan Eco-quartier Fluvial, Mantes la Jolie

== Bibliography ==
- Jo Coenen, The Discovery of Architecture. Mit H. Ibelings. Berlin, 1991. ISBN 3-433-02292-5
- Jo Coenen, From Urban Design to Architectural Detail. With contributions by Umberto Barbieri, Neave Brown, Otto Maier et al. Hamburg, 2005. ISBN 3-7643-7196-X

== Gallery ==
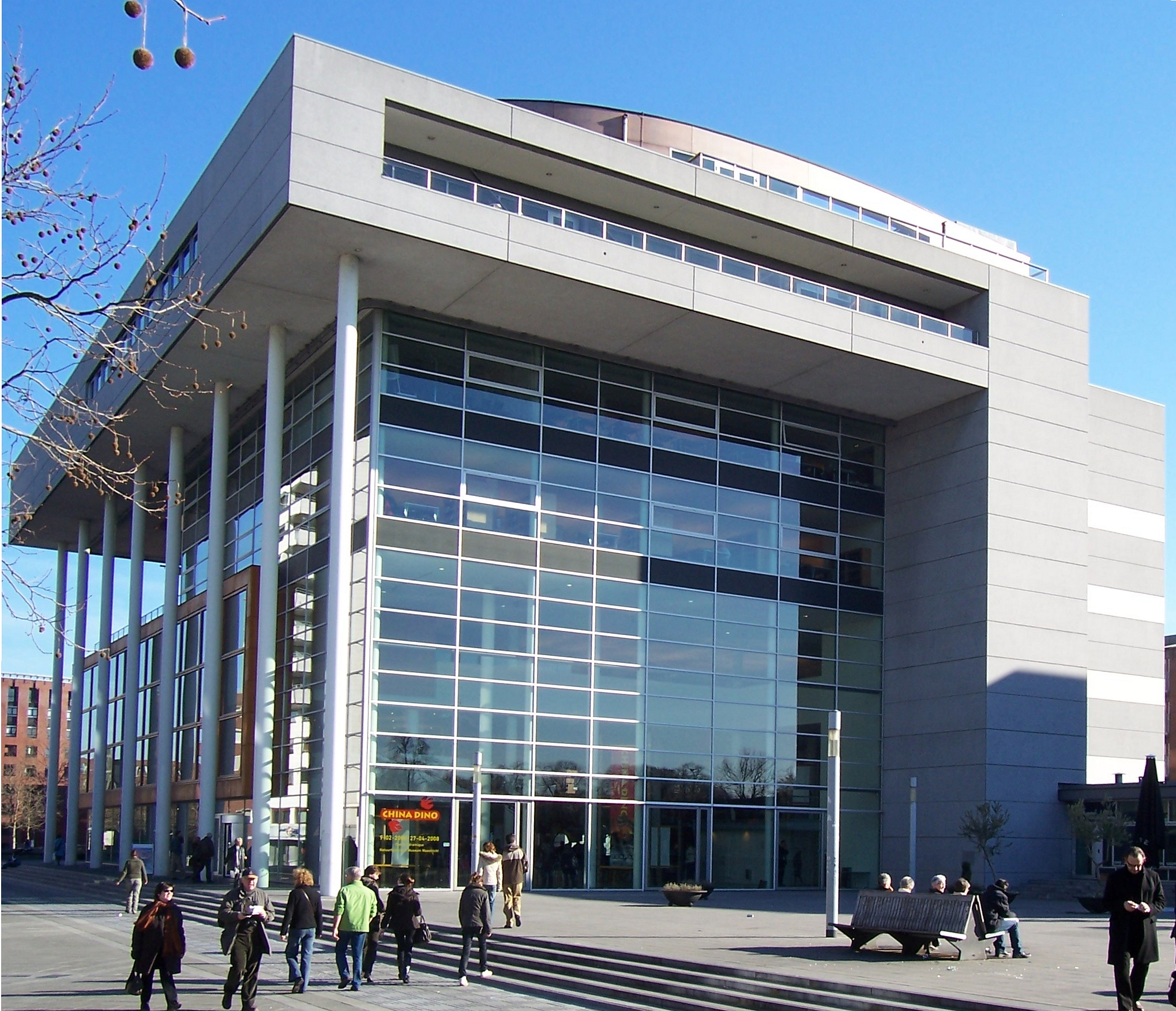
Centre Céramique, Maastricht

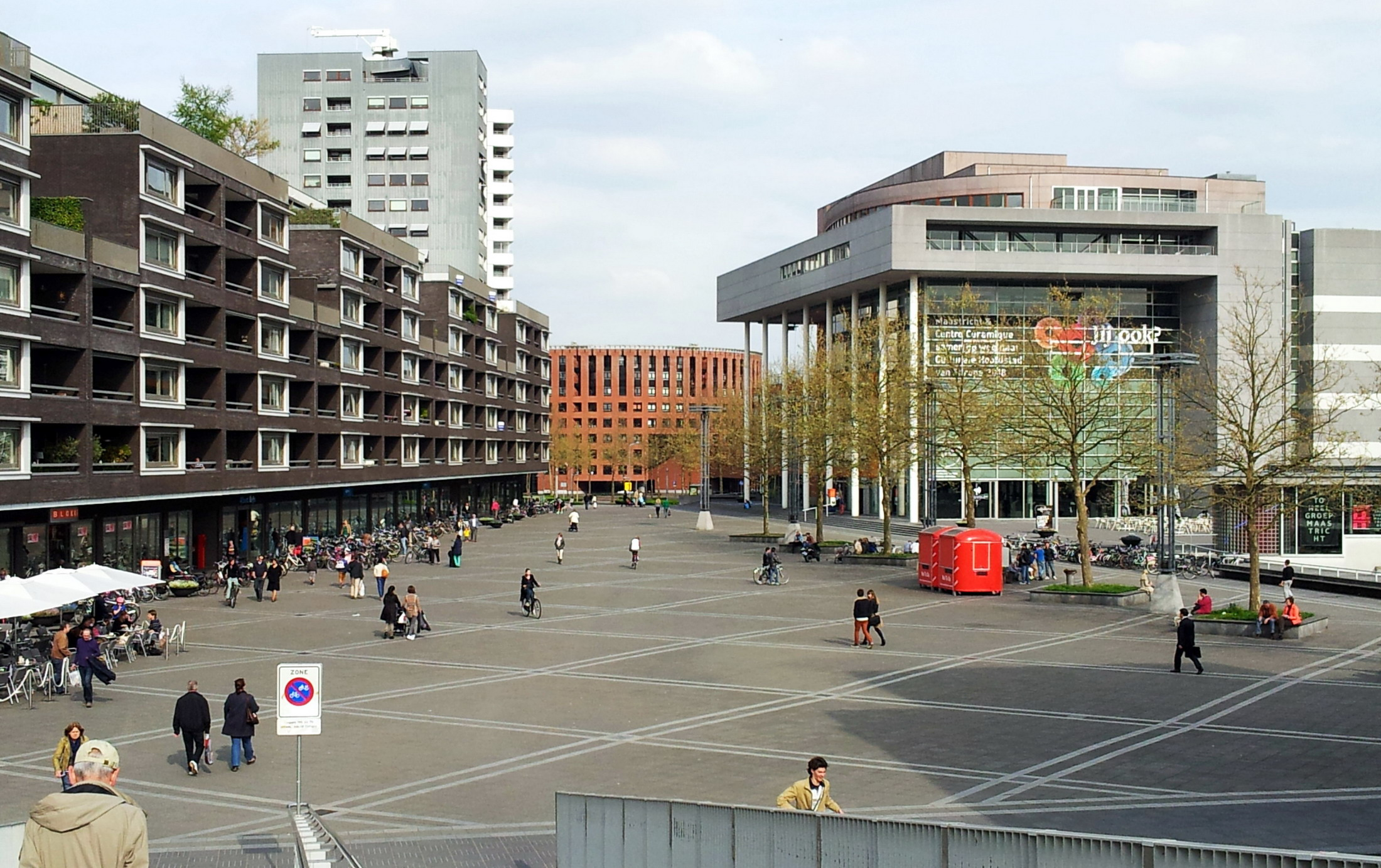
Plein 1992 in Céramique, Maastricht

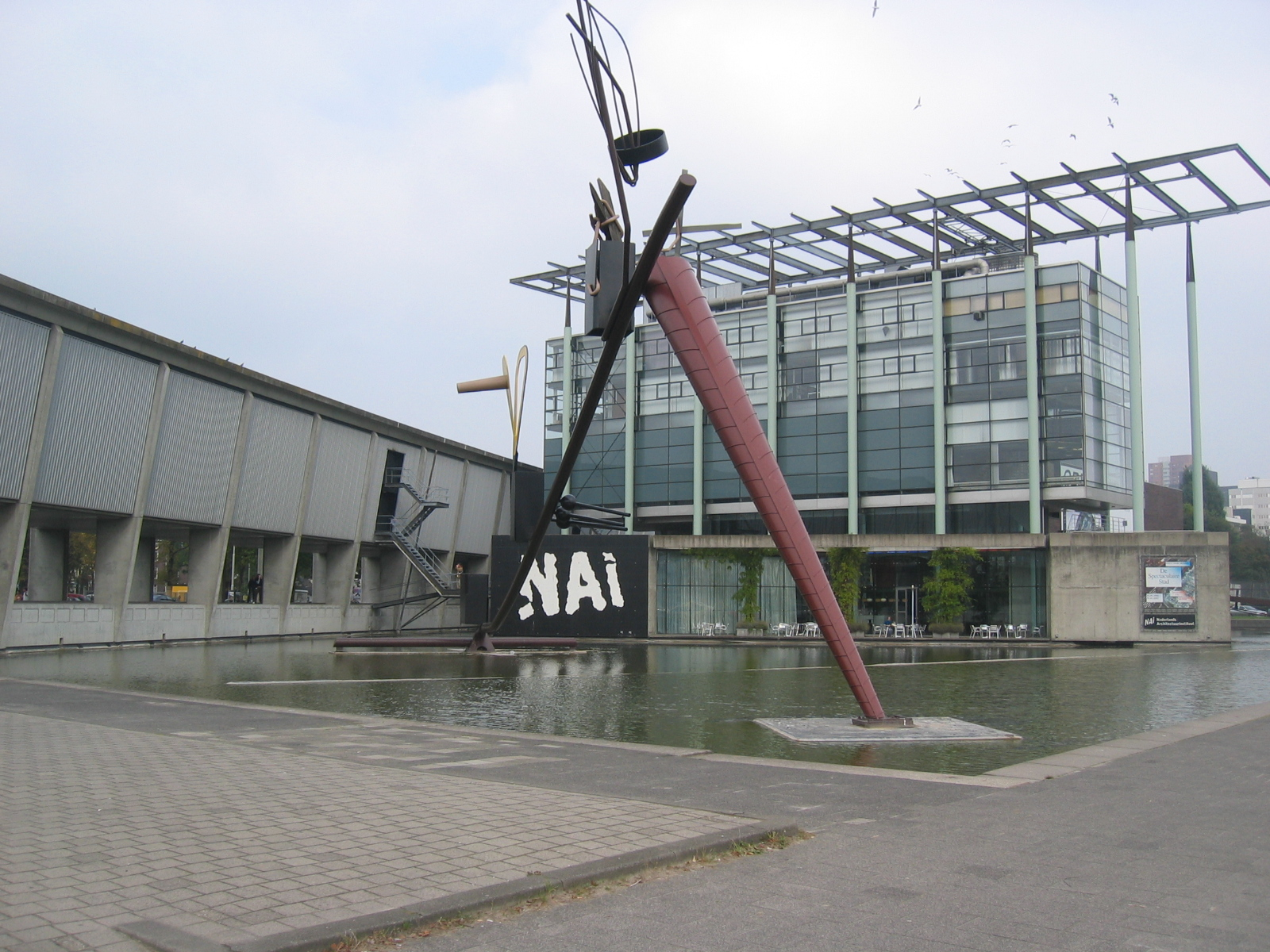
Netherlands Architecture Institute, Rotterdam

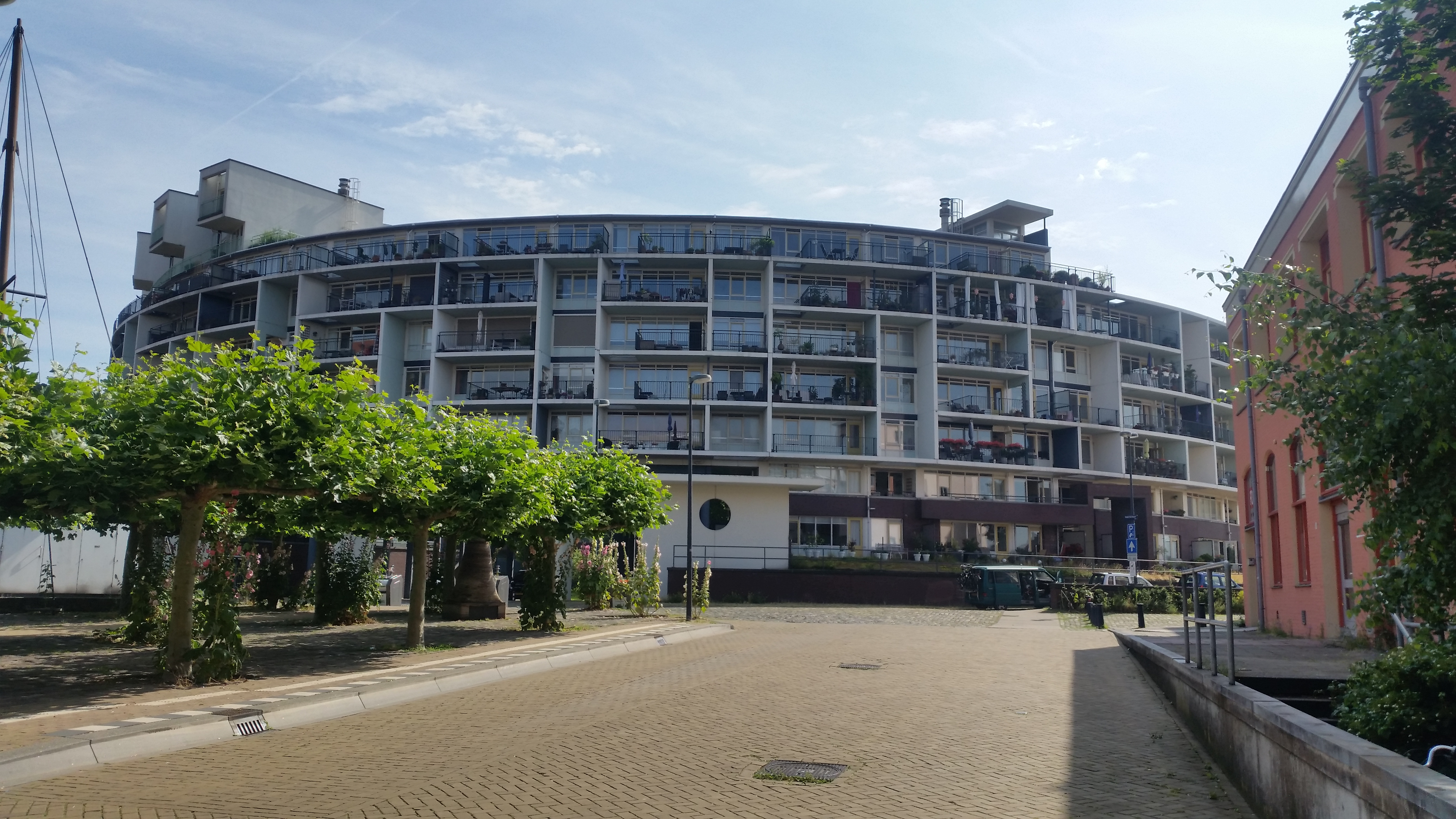
Emerald Empire, Amsterdam

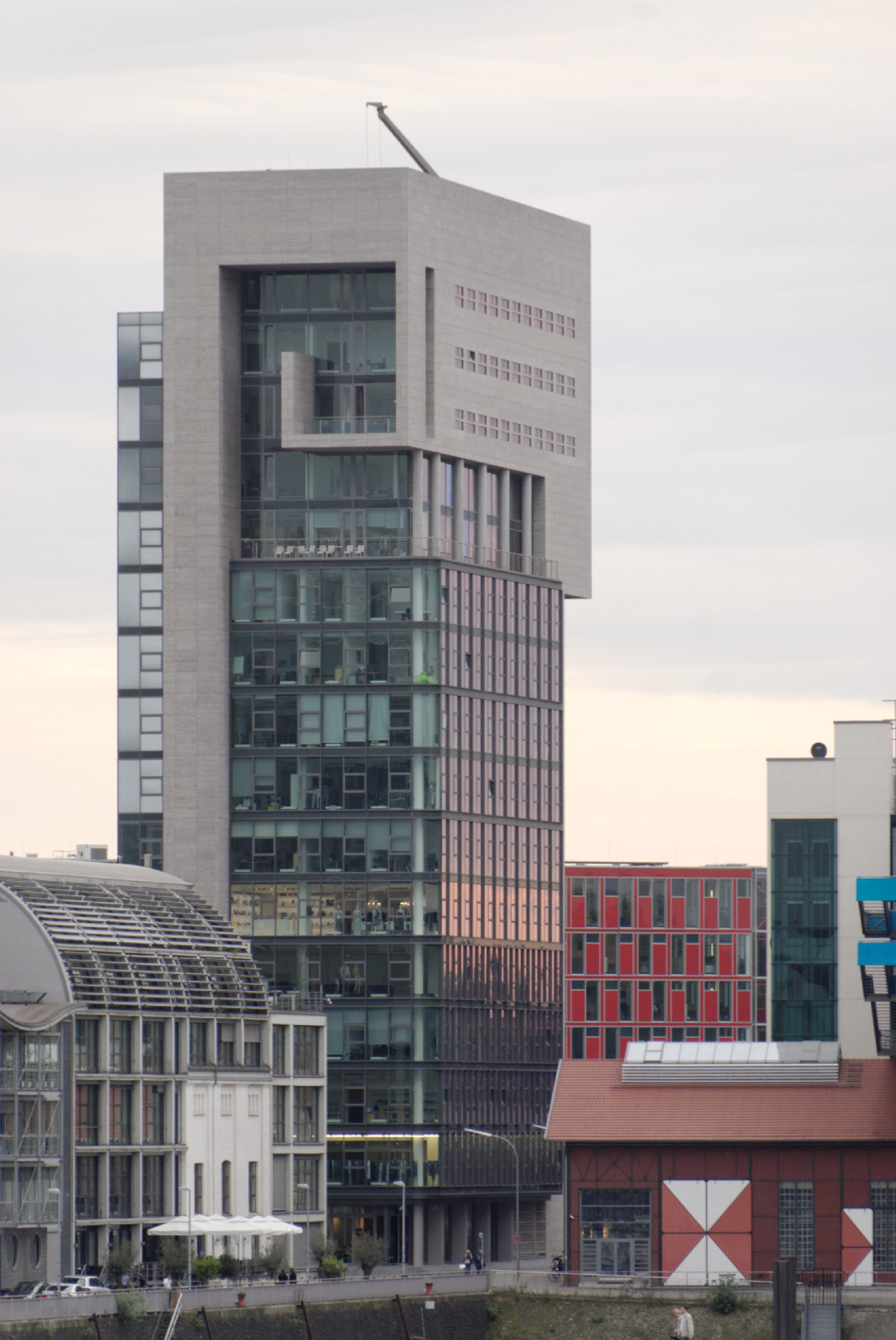
DOCK, Düsseldorf

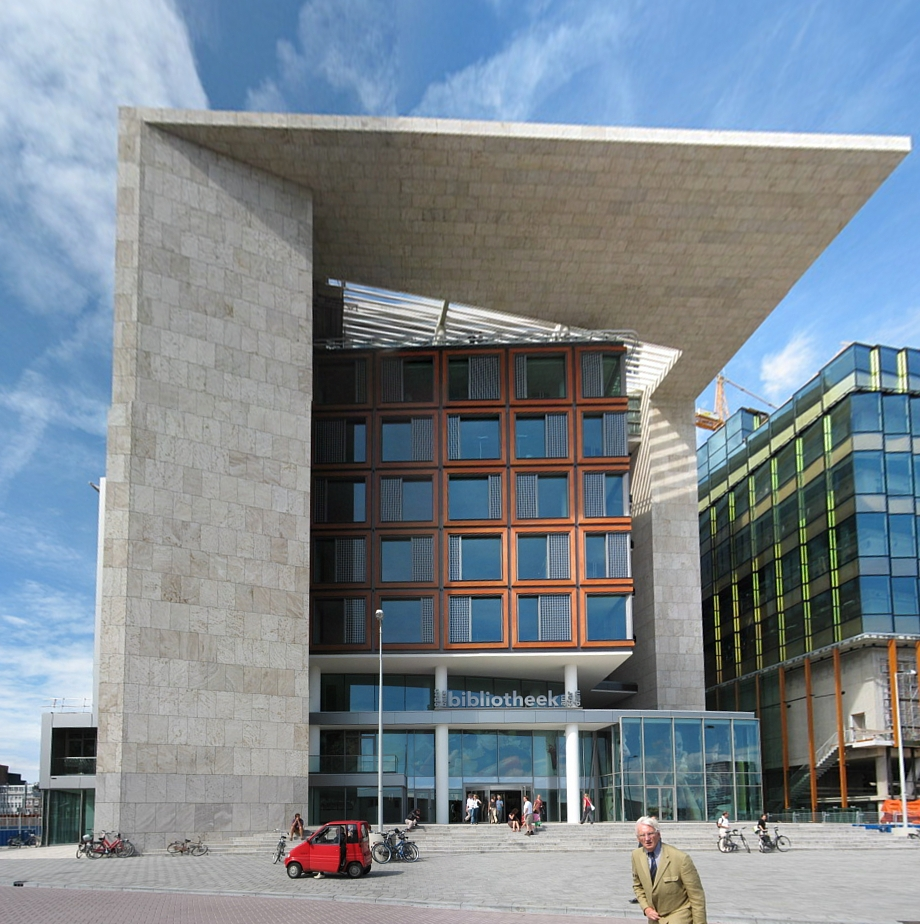
Public Library, Amsterdam

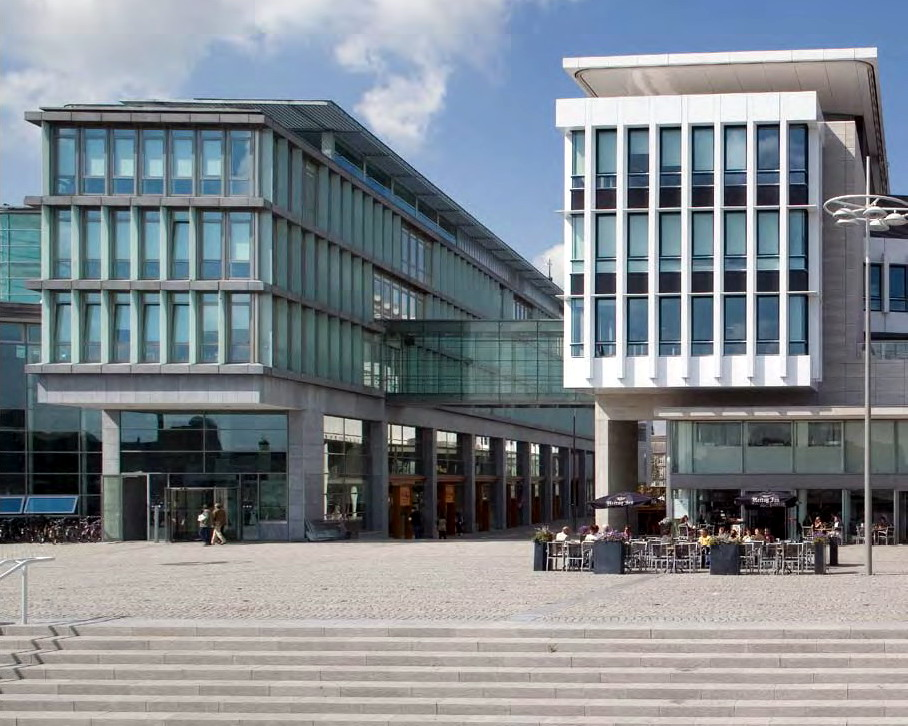
Mosae Forum, Maastricht
