= Vesteda Toren =

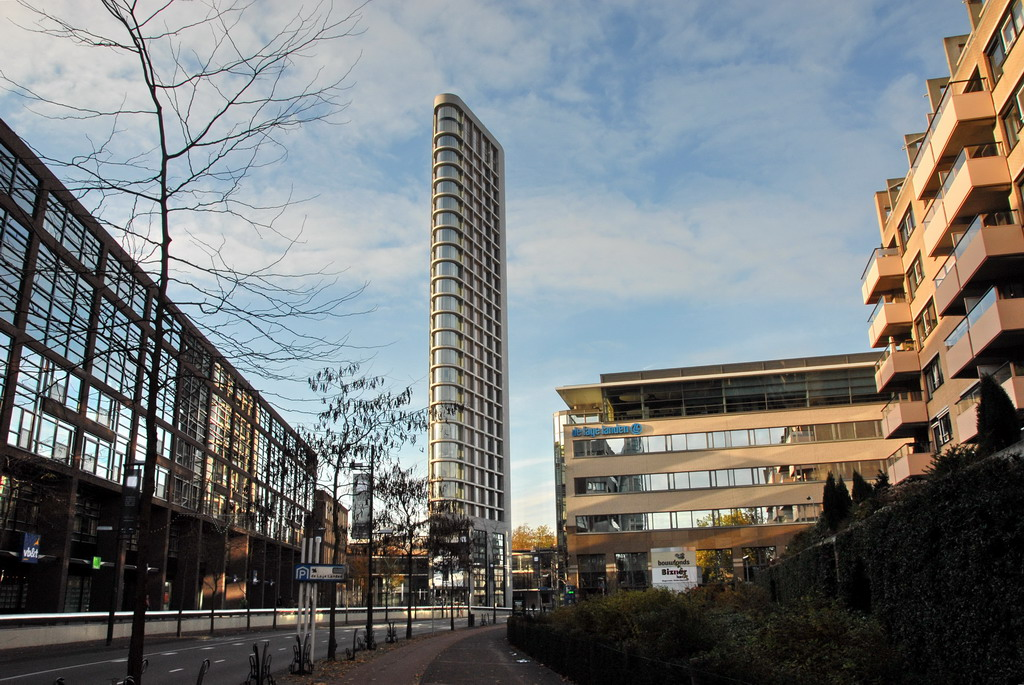

- Location within North Brabant

General information
- Type: Residential condominiums
- Location: Eindhoven, Netherlands
- Coordinates: 51.437567°N 5.482427°E
- Construction started: 2004
- Completed: 2006
- Inaugurated: 27 October 2006

Height
- Height: 90 m (295 ft)

Technical details
- Floor count: 28

Design and construction
- Architect: Jo Coenen
- Architecture firm: Jo Coenen & Co Architekten
- Structural engineer: Vesteda
- Awards: BNA Building of the Year; 2007

The Vesteda tower is located in Eindhoven and was finished in 2006. At 90 metres (295 feet) tall and 28 floors it is the fourth highest building in Eindhoven. It bears a resemblance to the Flatiron Building in Manhattan, New York City.

In 2007 it was awarded the BNA Building of the Year plaque (nl), by the Royal Institute of Dutch Architects (nl).

== Gallery ==
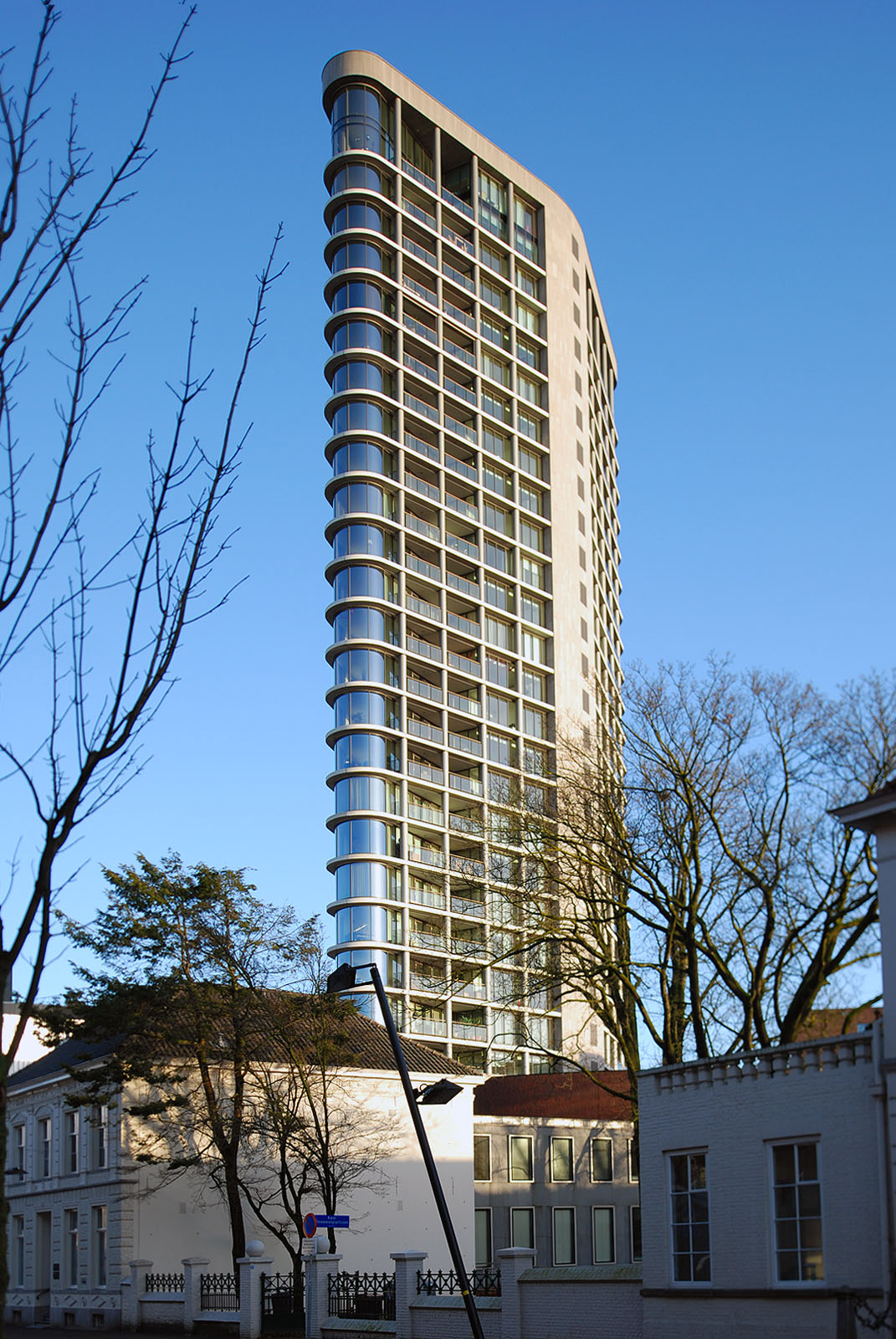

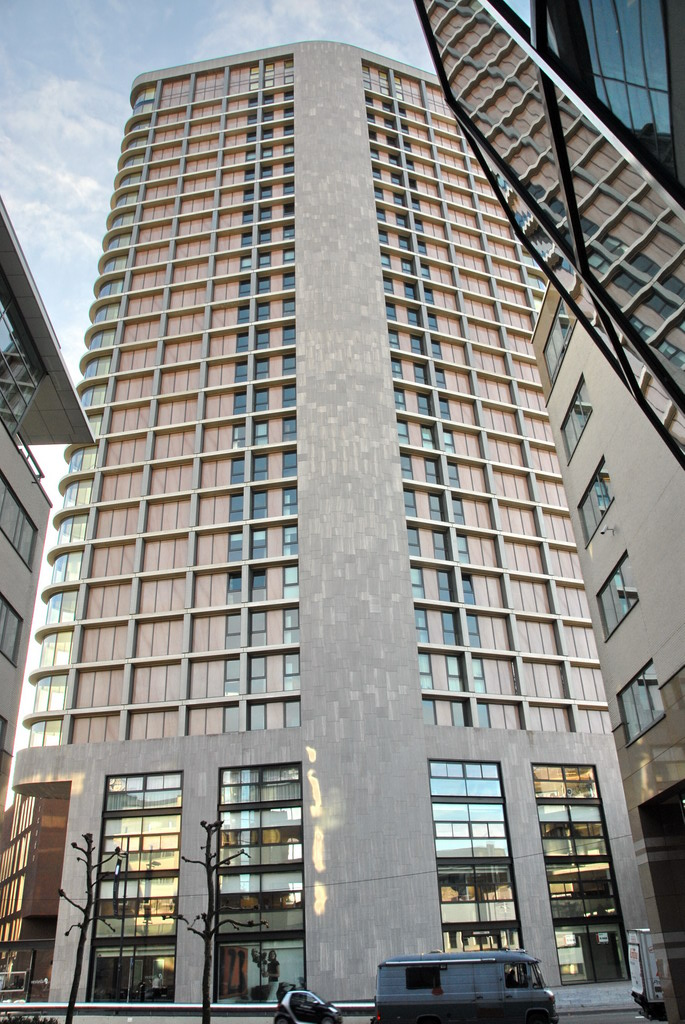

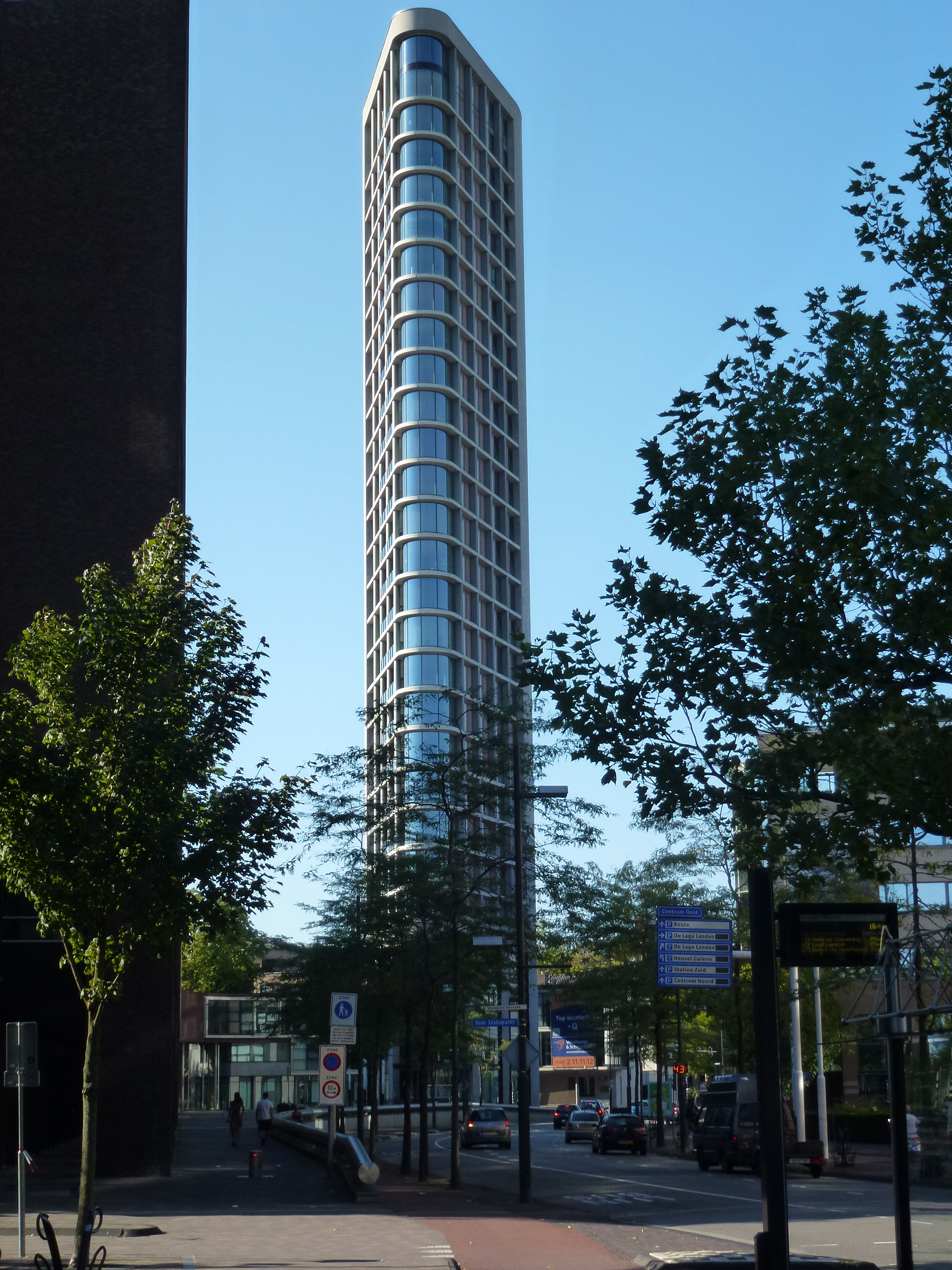

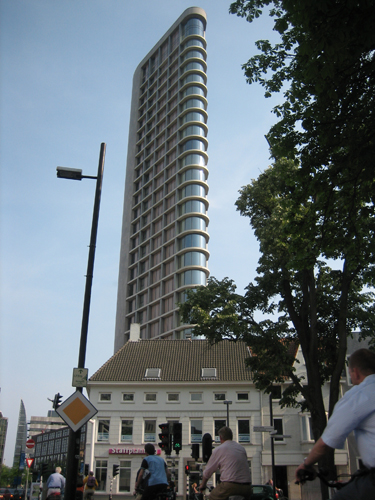

== See also ==
- List of tallest buildings in Eindhoven
