= Porthos (building) =

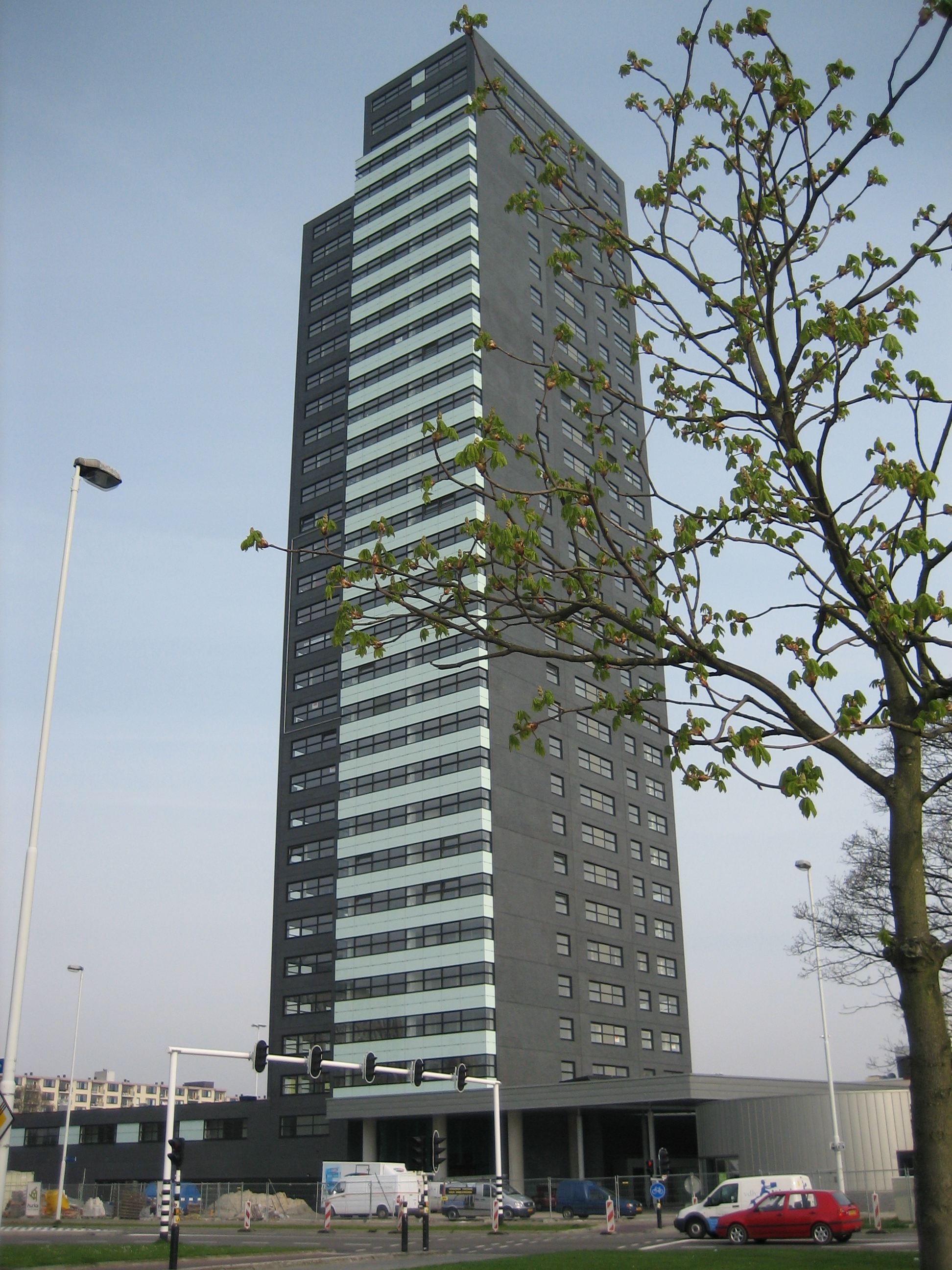
- Porthos in April 2006

- Location within North Brabant

General information
- Status: In use
- Type: Apartments
- Location: Eindhoven
- Coordinates: 51°28′4″N 5°28′29″E
- Construction started: Spring 2004
- Opened: 2006
- Cost: €24.5 million

Height
- Height: 101 m (331 ft)

Technical details
- Floor count: 32

Design and construction
- Architecture firm: Engelman
- Main contractor: Hurks

Porthos, with its height of 101 metres (331 feet), is the fifth tallest building in the Dutch city of Eindhoven. At the time of construction, it was the second tallest. The building is used as an apartment building and has a total of 108 units. Porthos has 32 floors.

Porthos was built between the springs of 2004 and 2006. ING Real Estate Development was the developer of the apartment building. That company was given the task to renovate and expand a shopping center called Woensel. The municipality of Eindhoven asked ING to add residential use to the shopping center. The company added three residential buildings to Woensel, collectively called "De Drie Musketiers" (Dutch for The Three Musketeers), of which Porthos is the tallest. Porthos was built on top of the shopping center. Also an underground parking garage was built underneath the apartment building. The firm Engelman designed Porthos with the help of the engineering firm Zonneveld. The costs of the construction amounted to €24.5 million.

Porthos consists of prefab concrete parts and because of that the building was topped out within one hundred days. When the prefab elements were placed on their locations, they already had been equipped with glass and pipes. The exterior of Porthos is made of ceramic bricks and aluminium. The chambranles consist of aluminium as well. A rooftop terrace, that is only accessible to the inhabitants of the penthouses, is situated on top of the apartment building. All apartment units are owner-occupied and according to Gerard van de Ven, manager real estate at Hurks, seventeen units had been sold previous to the start of the construction. Almost all units had been sold by the time the building was finished, according to Van de Ven.

On November 14, 2007, it was announced that Porthos won the 2007 Betonprijs in the category "execution". The judge said the construction of Porthos didn't cause much disturbance because of the short duration of the construction and because of the relatively small space the construction required. According to the judge, this was the result of the extensive prefabrication.

== See also ==
- List of tallest buildings in Eindhoven
