= Margaret Helfand =

American architect and urban planner

Margaret Helfand (June 26, 1947 – June 20, 2007) was a Manhattan-based New York architect and urban planner who served as president of the New York chapter of the American Institute of Architects.

== Early life and education ==
Helfand was born in Pasadena, California, on June 26, 1947. She studied at Swarthmore College (1965–1968) and completed her B.A. at the University of California - Berkeley. After graduating with her B.A. from Berkeley, she attended the Architectural Association School in London in 1970, where she also studied at the International Institute of Design. She received her M.Arch from University of California - Berkeley.

== Career ==
Helfand was a Manhattan architect and urban planner who has been recognized worldwide for her innovative approach to design of institutional buildings, interiors, and college campuses. Her designs emphasize clean elemental forms, the use of natural materials and the integration of her buildings with the surrounding landscape.

After working in the 1970s for Skidmore, Owings & Merrill and Marcel Breuer Associates, she opened her own firm, Helfand Architecture, in 1981.

Breaking through gender typecasting which often relegates female architects to designing houses and interiors, she executed many large-scale institutional and commercial works. Her firm's designs won many awards and her work is honored in a monograph published in 1999 by Monacelli Press. Some of her work included Kohlberg Hall and the Unified Science Center at Swarthmore College and the Mount Pleasant, South Carolina, headquarters for Automated Trading Desk.

Ms. Helfand was elected to the College of Fellows by the American Institute of Architects in 1998. She was recipient of the 2002 Rome Prize in Architecture.

She helped create the Center for Architecture, a hub for exhibitions in the field and the home of the New York chapter of the institute. She was a co-chairman of New York New Visions, a civic group that advised government agencies on urban design and planning guidelines for the redevelopment of Lower Manhattan after the destruction of the World Trade Center.

== Personal life ==
When she was studying in London, she sailed a 90' schooner with friends to Spain and the Caribbean. After she completed her master's degree, she sailed from Costa Rica across the South Pacific. She was also interested in modern dance.

Helfand was married to Jon A. Turner, who is an emeritus professor of Information Systems at New York University. She died in New York City, New York, six days before her 60th birthday, in 2007 from complications of colon cancer.

== Bibliography ==
- Margaret Helfand Architects: Essential Architecture (1999), Monacelli Press, ISBN 978-1885254931
