= Sunken House =

Coordinates: 51°32′29″N 0°04′51″W

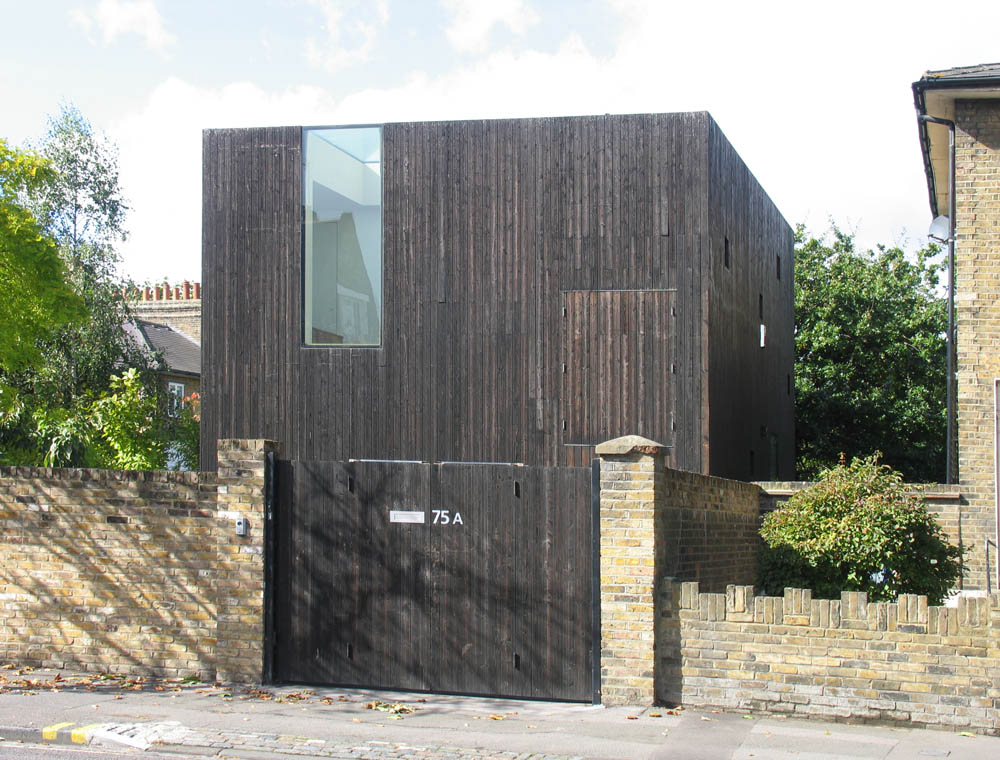
The Sunken House in 2012

The Sunken House at 75a De Beauvoir Road, is a house in De Beauvoir Town, in the London Borough of Hackney. It was built in 2007 to designs by David Adjaye. It was built for the photographer Ed Reeve.

The house is clad in stained black cedar. The site for the house was excavated to the level of a basement.

The website of David Adjaye Associates writes that the house "both extends and polarises the usual pattern" of the surrounding semi-detached Victorian villas, with a private courtyard below the house and its panoramic views. The bedrooms of the house are on the first floor with a large studio on the second floor. The full height of the house cannot be seen from the street, and it is not overlooked by its neighbours. The design of the house mirrors nearby workshop buildings and matches the size of the Victorian villas that adjoin it.

On April Fools' Day 2015 Reeve submitted a planning application for a private railway station for Crossrail 2 which would be built directly underneath the house. Reeve and his family would access the trains by the means of travellators that would accelerate to the speed of the passing trains to enable them to board without disruption.
