= Jorge Arango =

Colombian architect (1917–2007)

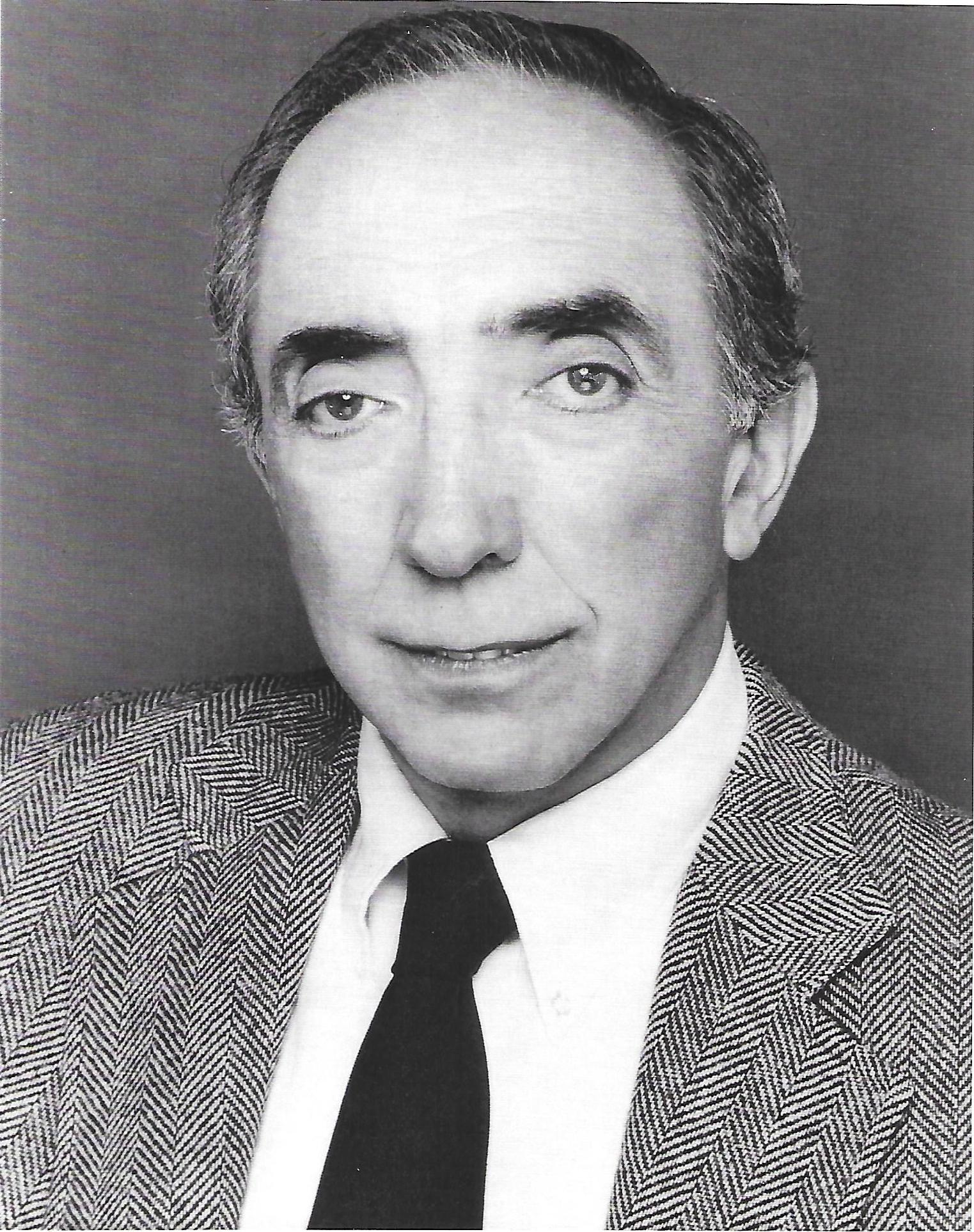

Jorge Arango (29 November 1917 – 21 October 2007) was a Colombian-born US architect.

Arango was born in Bogotá, Colombia, and educated in Chile, Colombia and at Harvard. Arango was invited to come to America by the Museum of Modern Art in New York, and the U.S. State Department.

He was co-founder of the Arango design store in the Dadeland Mall in South Miami in 1959 with his then-wife, Judith. The store, which still exists, was an early beacon of good design, a pre-Luminaire. At Arango, designers could equip the 1960s Bauhaus-inspired homes in Coconut Grove with Iittala glassware and Alvar Aalto chairs.

An advocate of a minimalist architecture and maximum human value in design, Arango was a designer, educator, and writer. He taught architecture at the University of California Berkeley in the 1950s, For years he wrote passionate columns against developments in Miami like Bayside, and condo towers that blocked the streets off from the water. He designed several modest-size homes in Miami that displayed his design credo: an open flow of rooms, natural breezes, large windows, no baseboards, small tiles in the bathroom, large tiles in the rest of the home.

He was a professor of Architecture at the District University of Bogotá, a columnist for the Miami Herald, and a correspondent for magazines like Metropolitan Home and Elle Décor. Over the years he wrote many books including "The Urbanization of the Earth" (1970), "Villa Sofia" (2003), and "Ecophilia: The Future Is Waiting" (2000).

Arango died at home in Miami in hospice care. He was survived by his third wife, Penelope, two sons and two daughters, and the design store.
