= Strijp-S =

Neighborhood in Eindhoven

Strijp-S (Dutch pronunciation: [ˈstrɛip ˈɛs]) is a neighborhood and former industrial park in the Eindhoven district of Strijp. The area belonged to electronics company Philips. Since 2000, creative companies and housing have been established in the former industrial buildings. Eindhoven Strijp-S railway station serves the district.

== Name ==
The name Strijp-S comes from the naming pattern that Philips used in its industrial parks. Strijp-S was the first park, and Strijp-T and Strijp-R followed. The naming pattern followed the name STRIJP. Strijp is one of the 6 municipalities that now form the city of Eindhoven, the other being Eindhoven (which has city rights since 1232), Gestel, Tongelre, Stratum and Woensel.

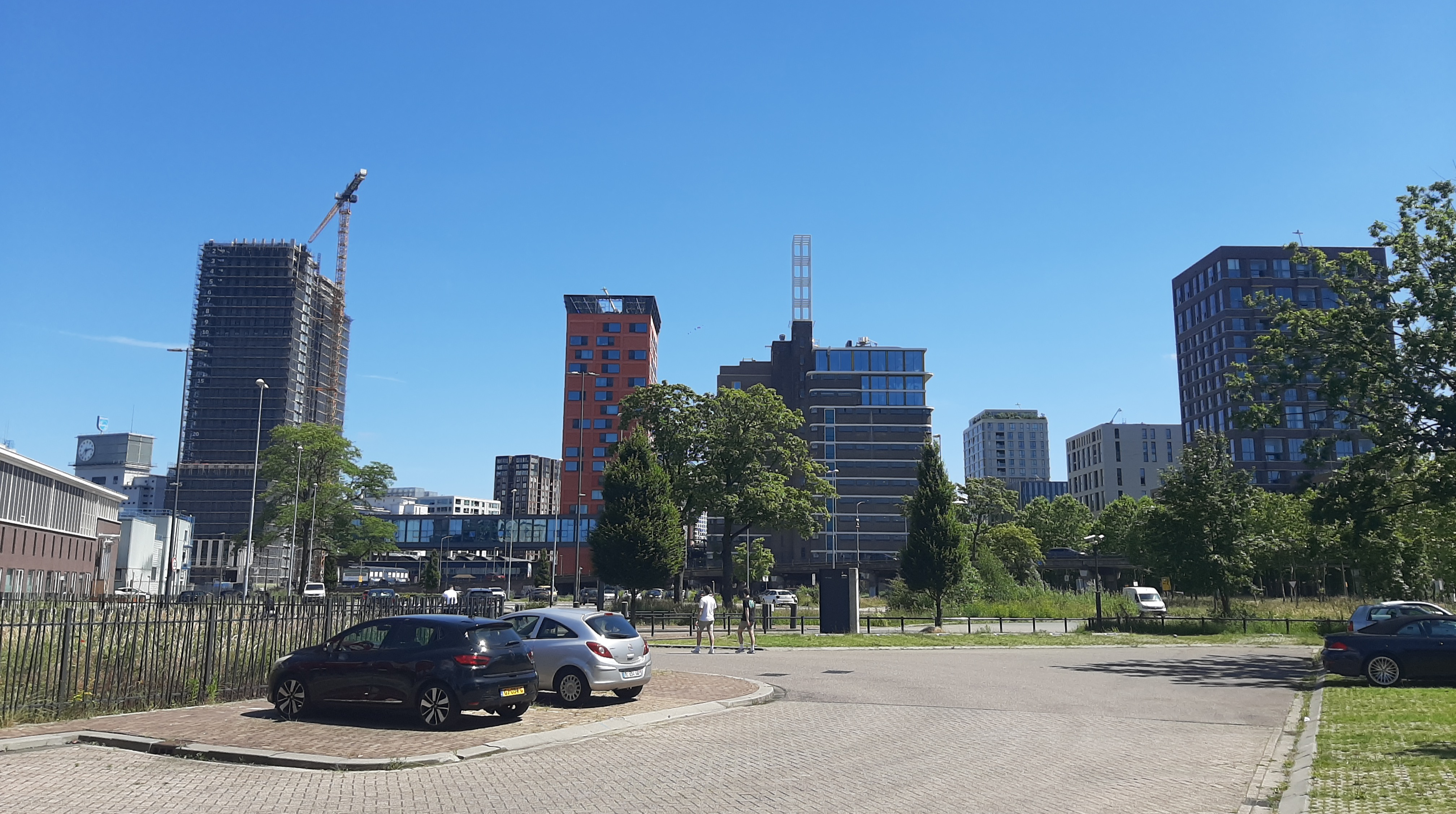

== History ==
=== Lamps, radios and televisions ===
In 1916 Anton Philips built the first factory in Strijp-S a glass factory for incandescent light bulbs. The Philips Natuurkundig Laboratorium was opened in 1914. Strijp-S was where first radios, then televisions were produced, as well as many other devices. The credo Van zand tot klant ("from sand to customer") stood behind the idea that Philips controlled every phase of production from research to storage, from glass blowing to cardboard factory: everything on one enormous piece of land.

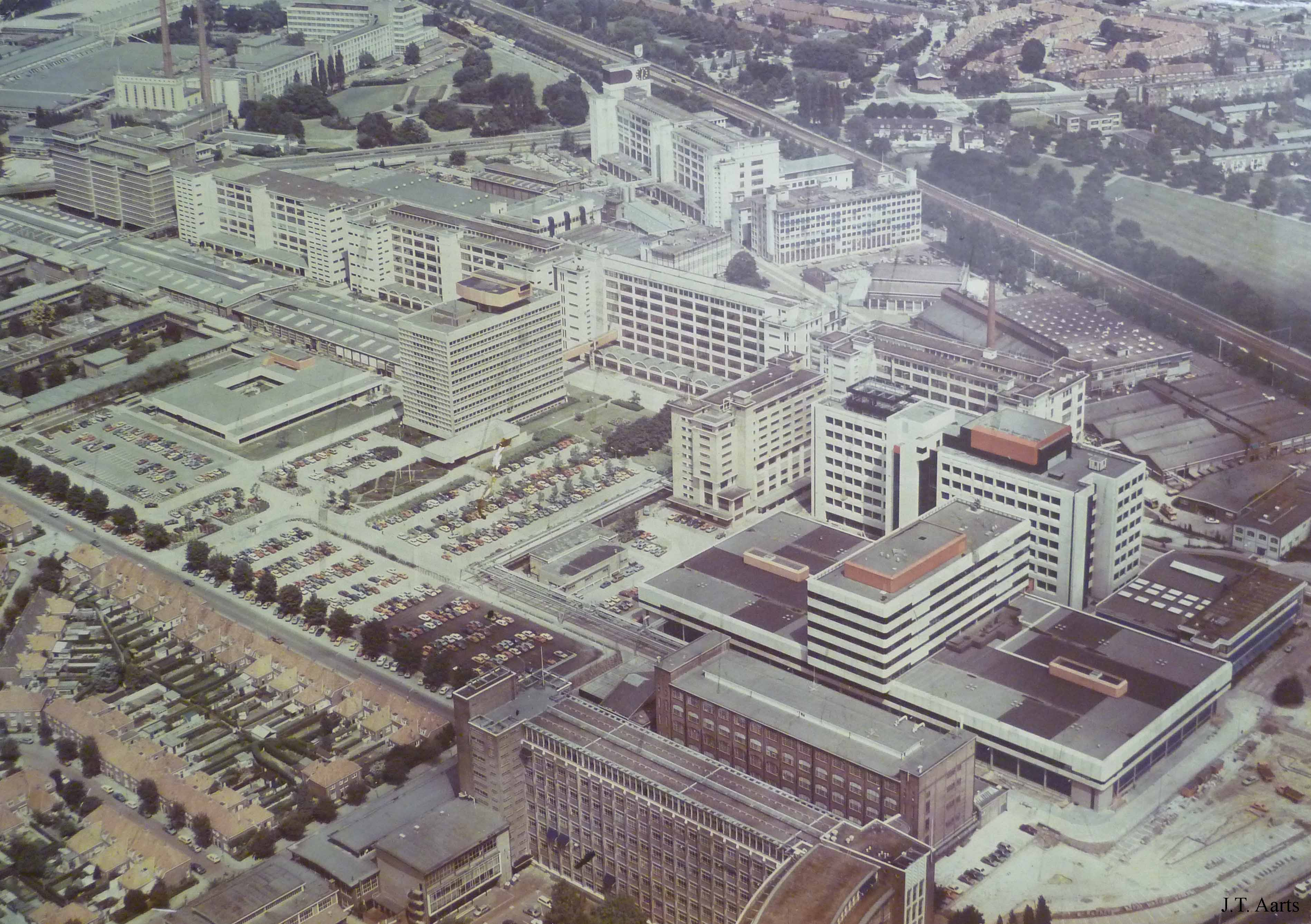
Aerial photo of Strijp-S, 1979.

=== Departure of Philips ===
In the 1990s Philips gradually left Eindhoven and in 2000 the first discussions took place about the repurposing of Strijp-S. In 2002 the land was sold for €140 million to Park Strijp Beheer B.V., a public private partnership between the city of Eindhoven and VolkerWessels. Philips was able to lease some of the buildings back temporarily until its full withdrawal in 2006, although there are still two small Philips departments present in the buildings SFH en SEY.

== Adaptive reuse and Strijp-S today ==
=== Project for adaptive reuse ===
With the departure of Philips the plans was implemented to make the area a broad destination for the creative sector, including technology and design, under the English headline Old Buildings, New Ideas. The old factory buildings would be perfect for studios. In 2016 the creative school St. Lucas opened at Strijp-S.

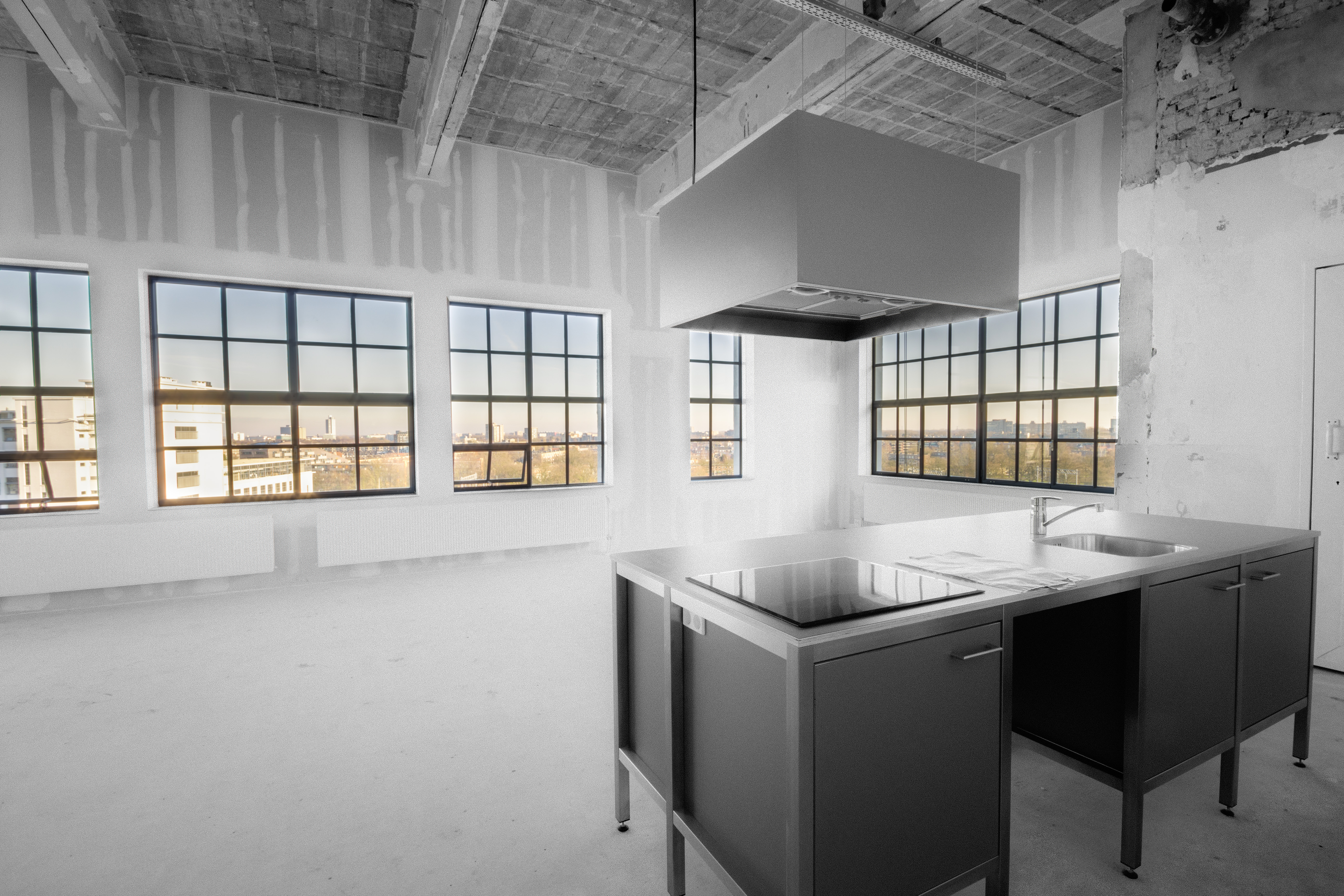
A loft in the GERARD building

=== Residential ===
In 2012 Strijp-S got its first permanent residents, when the SAS-3 project was completed (new construction). A year later the repurposed industrial SAN en SBP buildings were ready for residential use. Lofts replaced former television factories. The buildings were renamed GERARD and ANTON, in honor of two prominenta members of the Philips family. Many other residential complexes are planned such as Space-S and Blok 61, 63 and 59. A year later the industrial buildings SAN and SBP were also ready for residential use.

The profile of the residents skews very young, with 78.2% of the residents are between 20 and 34 versus 24.6% in Eindhoven as a whole.

The Dillen family (of former Philips CEO Cor Dillen) lived in the Blazerstraat

=== Restaurants, cafés, bars ===
In the Veemgebouw in 2015 the food hall Vershal Het Veem opened.

=== Arts and culture ===
At Strijp-S you can visit MU Hybrid Art House (Torenallee 40-06) which showcases many different mediums of art aimed for younger audiences.

Furthermore, the De Ontdekfabriek is located at Strijp-S: a children's science discovery space.

=== Events ===
Strijp-S is a major event space, in the halls of the Klokgebouw building, but also larger events on the Ketelhuisplein plaza. For example, dance festival Flying Dutch in 2015 attracted 25,000 visitors. Dutch Design Week takes place each October. Every third Sunday of the month Strijp-S hosts the FeelGood Markt market.

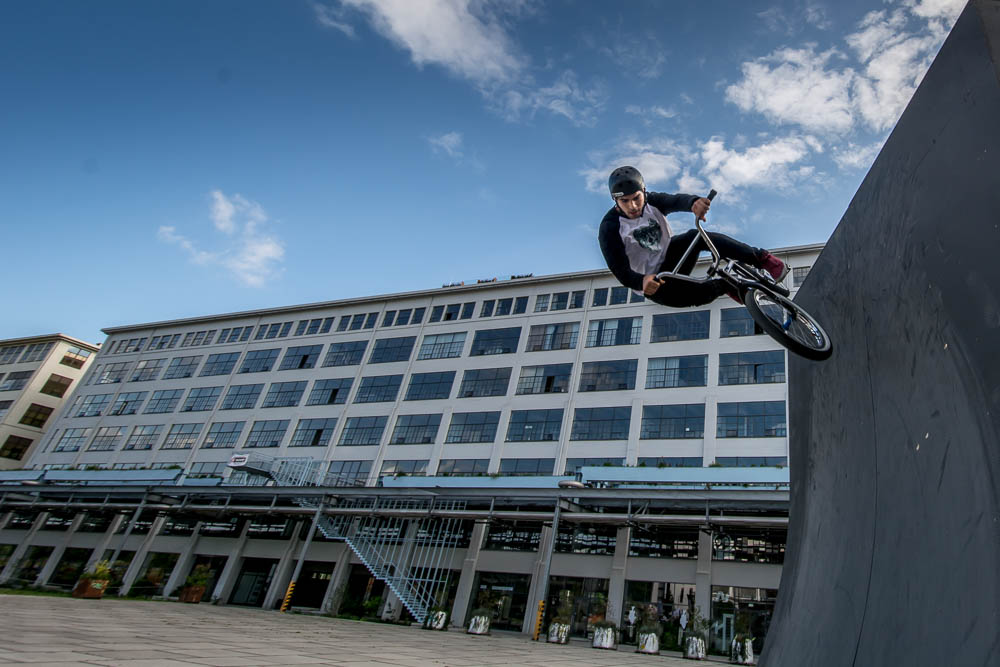
A BMX expert honing his skills

=== Sports ===
Strijp-S is a magnet for urban sports. Skateboarding, BMX and bouldering as well as bootcamp classes.

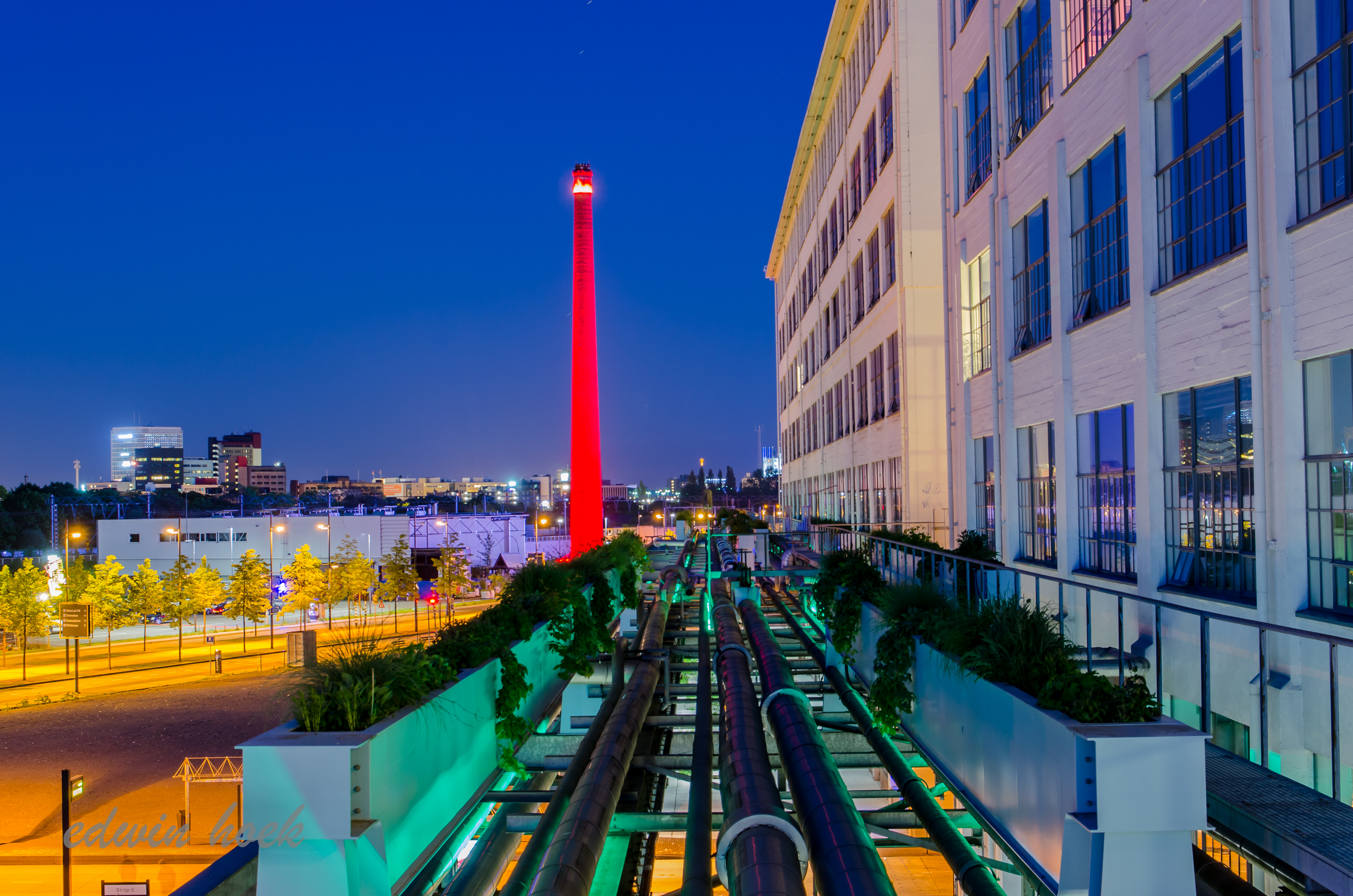
Art consisting of light works by Har Holland

=== Light Art ===
Strijp-S is a place for experimentation with LED lighting, which keeps the historic connection with Philips' past. Some light art includes the project Fakkel by Har Hollands. In the underground passage to NatLab artist Daan Roosegaarde installed his project Crystal.

Strijp-S is a regular location for the light festival GLOW.

== Points of interest ==
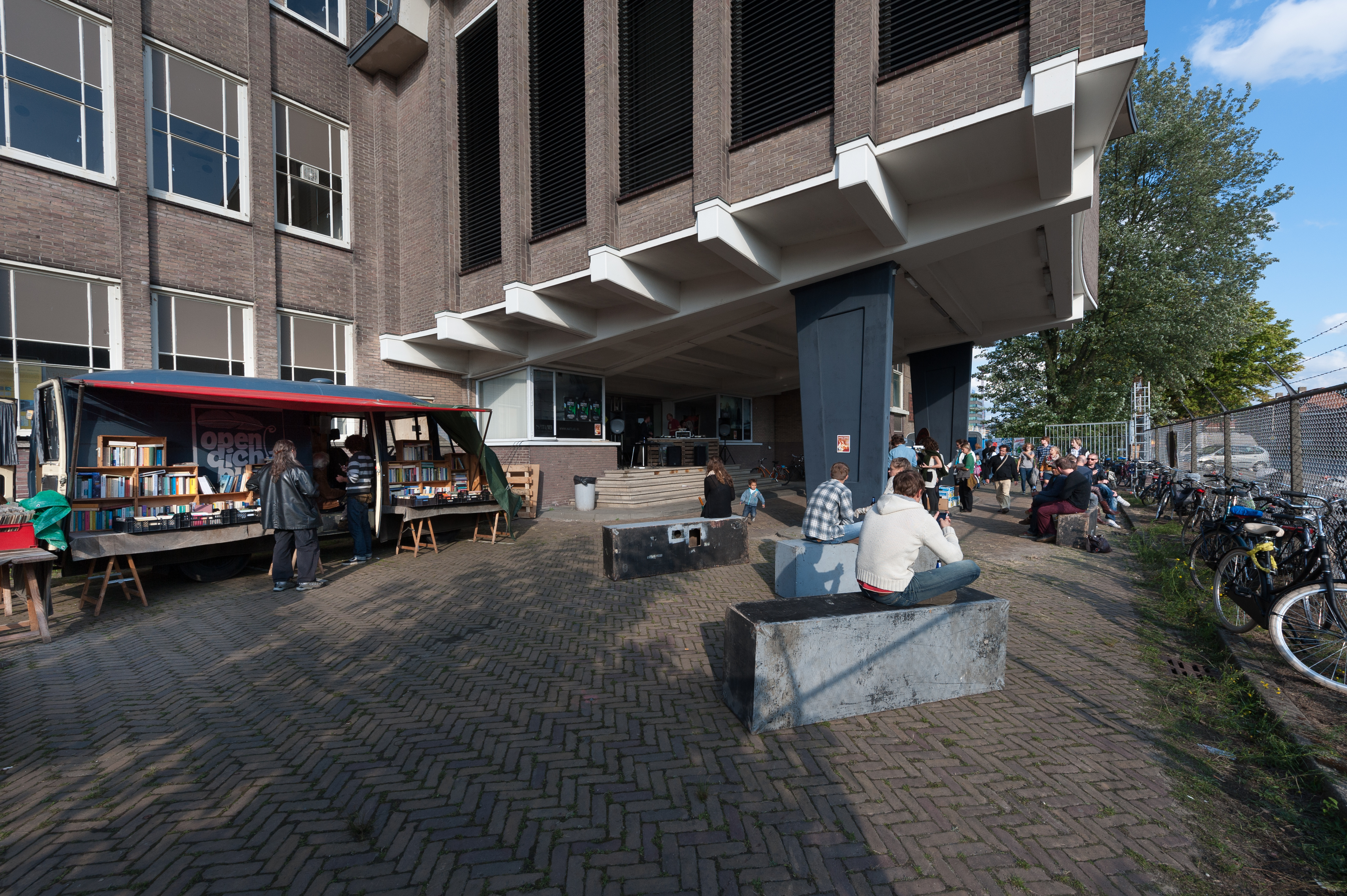
Activities at NatLab

- Philips Natuurkundig Laboratorium or NatLab
- Klokgebouw ("Clock building")
- Hoge Rug. Three industrial buildings from 1927, 1929 and 1930
- Ketelhuis ("Kettle House") and Machinekamer ("Machine Room") from 1929.
- Veemgebouw ("Warehouse Building") from 1942 where tvs, radios and other items were warehoused.
- Leidingstraat ("Cable Street"). A network of cables ten meters high where once gas and other liquids flowed. Here is a garden by Piet Oudolf, and the light art by Har Hollands.
- Torenallee ("Tower Avenue"). A wide boulevard for strolling.
- SPACE-S. 7 colorful residential blocks decorated by the residents themselves, 402 residences in total.

== Official website ==
- Strijp-S website
