= Subdivision of Eindhoven into districts, quarters and neighborhoods =

The following lists give an overview of the subdivision of the city of Eindhoven into districts, quarters and neighborhoods, as determined by the municipality of Eindhoven.

Eindhoven consists of 7 districts, which are subdivided into a total of 19 quarters. The quarters are divided into a total of 109 neighborhoods.

== Districts ==
1. Centrum
2. Woensel-Noord
3. Woensel-Zuid
4. Tongelre
5. Stratum
6. Gestel
7. Strijp

== Quarters and neighborhoods by district ==
=== District Centrum ===
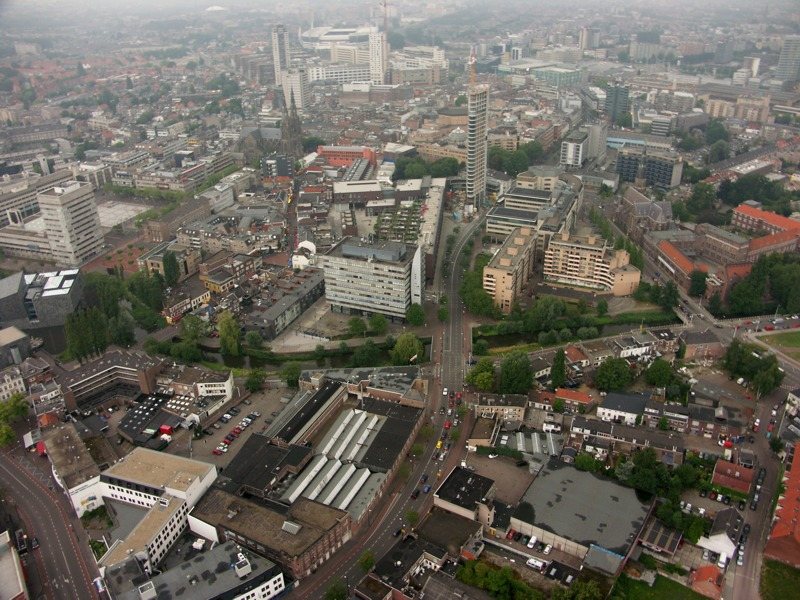
Quarter	Neighborhoods
Centrum	Binnenstad
Centrum	De Bergen
Centrum	Witte dame
Centrum	Fellenoord
Centrum	TU/e terrain

=== District Stratum ===
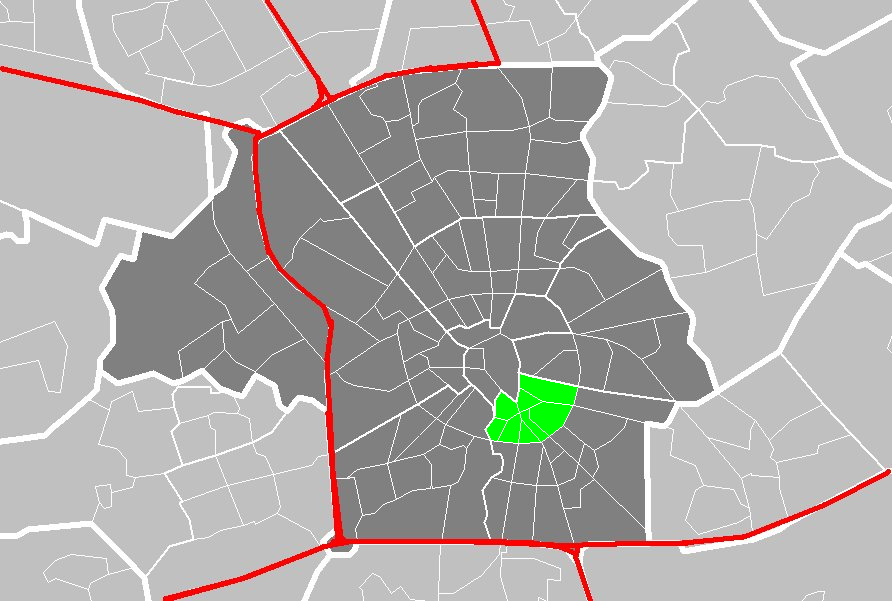
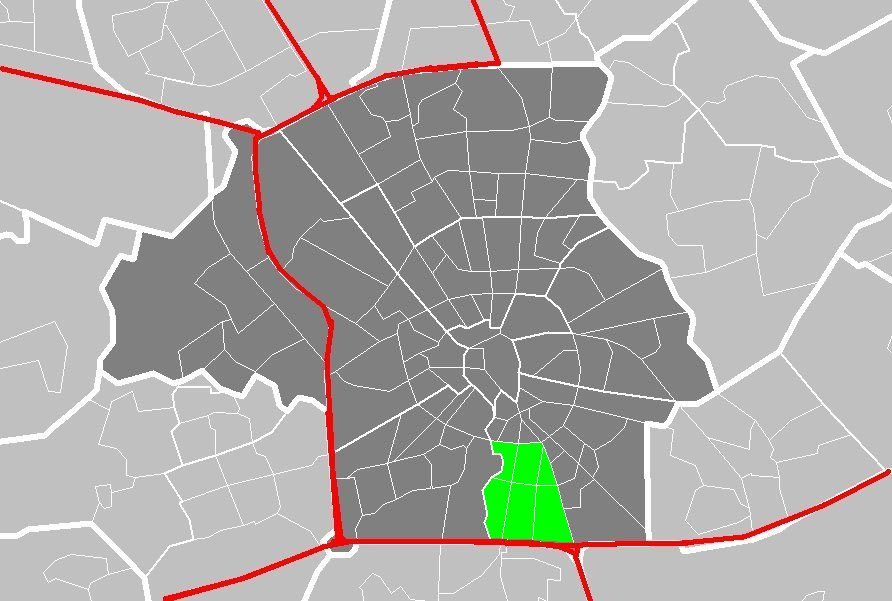
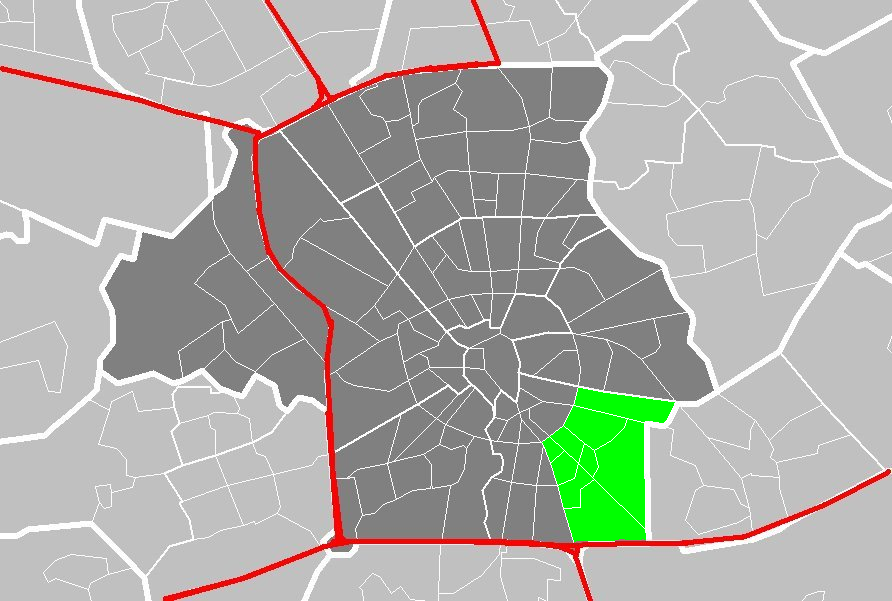
Quarter	Neighborhoods
Oud-Stratum	Irisbuurt
Oud-Stratum	Rochusbuurt
Oud-Stratum	Elzent-Noord
Oud-Stratum	Tuindorp (Witte Dorp)
Oud-Stratum	Heistraat (Joriskwartier)
Oud-Stratum	Bloemenplein (Bloemenbuurt)
Oud-Stratum	Looiakkers
Oud-Stratum	Elzent-Zuid
Kortonjo	Kerstroosplein
Kortonjo	Gerardusplein
Kortonjo	Genneperzijde (Poelhekkelaan)
Kortonjo	Roosten
Kortonjo	Eikenburg
Kortonjo	Sportpark Aalsterweg
Putten	Poeijers
Putten	Burghplan
Putten	Sintenbuurt
Putten	Tivoli
Putten	Gijzenrooi
Putten	Nieuwe Erven
Putten	Kruidenbuurt
Putten	Schuttersbosch
Putten	Leenderheide

=== District Tongelre ===
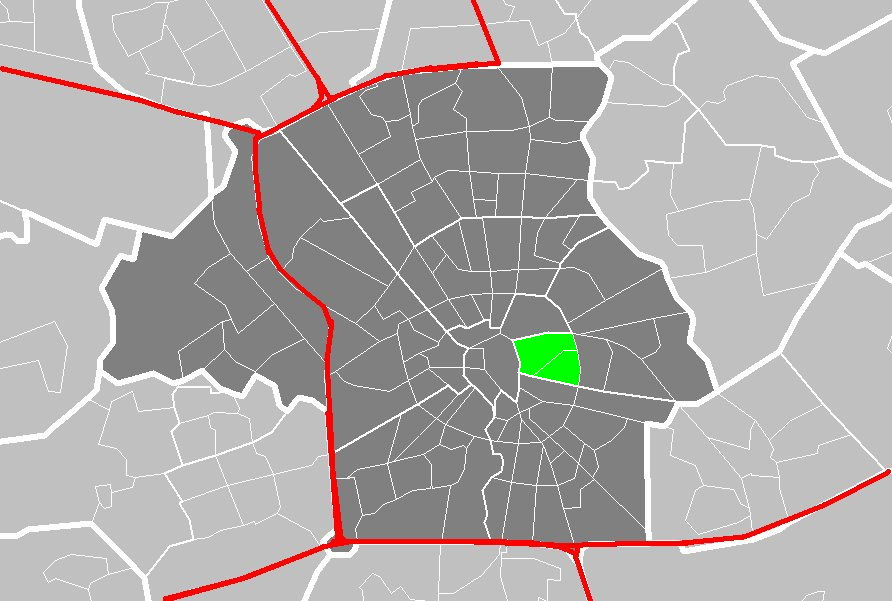
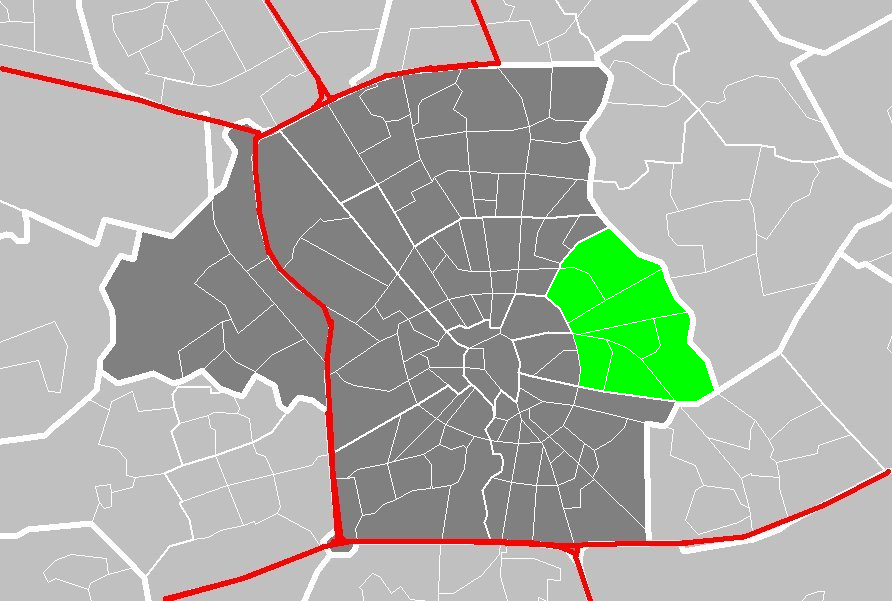
Quarter	Neighborhoods
De Laak	Villapark
De Laak	Lakerlopen
Oud-Tongelre	Doornakkers-West
Oud-Tongelre	Doornakkers-Oost
Oud-Tongelre	Muschberg, Geestenberg
Oud-Tongelre	Urkhoven
Oud-Tongelre	't Hofke
Oud-Tongelre	Karpen
Oud-Tongelre	Koudenhoven

=== District Woensel-Zuid ===
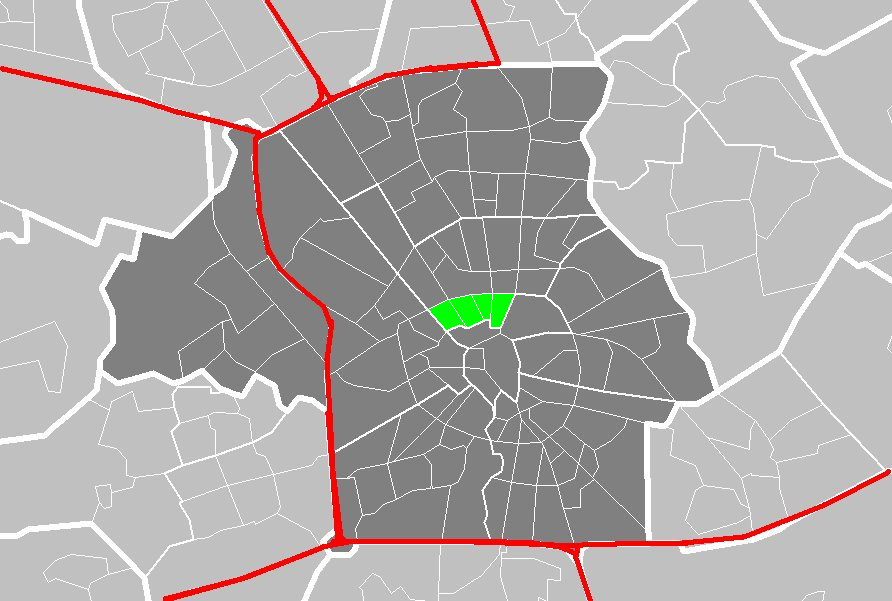
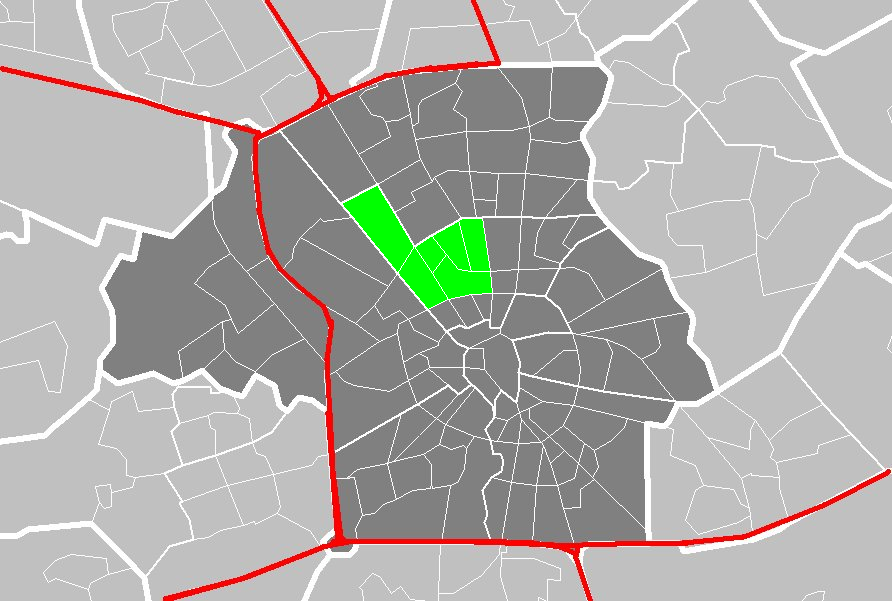
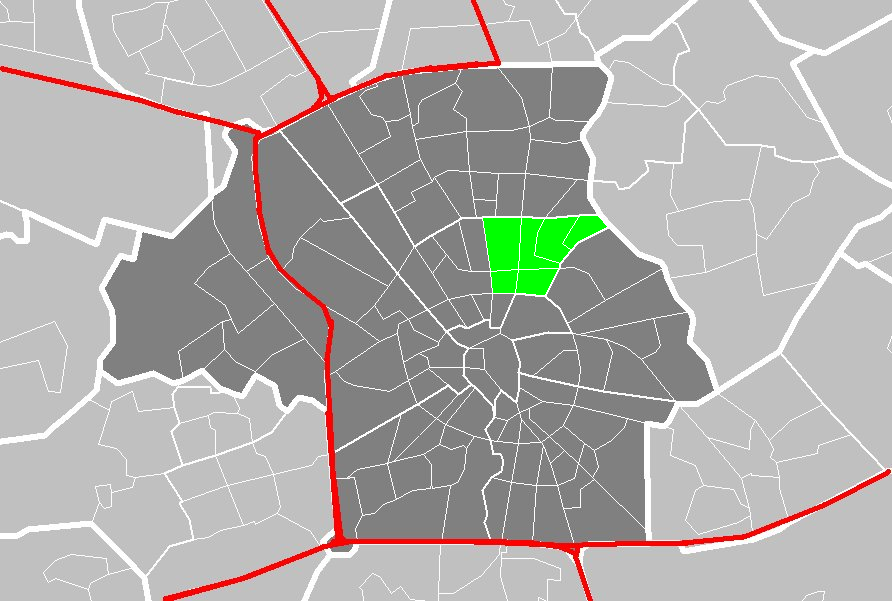
Quarter	Neighborhoods
Oud-Woensel	Limbeek
Oud-Woensel	Hemelrijken
Oud-Woensel	Gildebuurt
Oud-Woensel	Woenselse Watermolen
Erp	Groenewoud (Woensel-West)
Erp	Kronehoef
Erp	Barrier
Erp	Mensfort
Erp	Rapenland
Erp	Vredeoord
Begijnenbroek	Generalenbuurt (Rapenland-Oost)
Begijnenbroek	Oude Toren
Begijnenbroek	Hondsheuvels
Begijnenbroek	Oude Gracht-West
Begijnenbroek	Oude Gracht-Oost
Begijnenbroek	Eckartdal

=== District Woensel-Noord ===
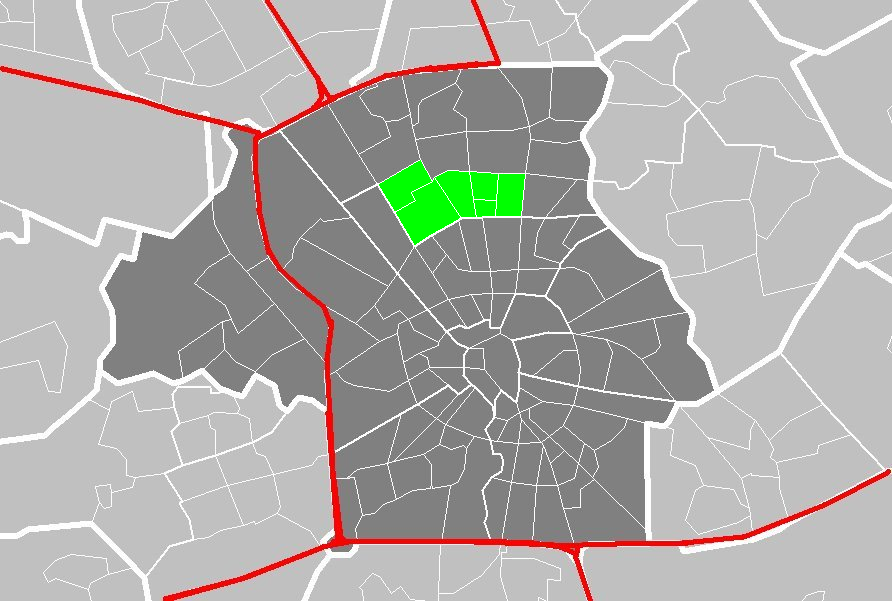
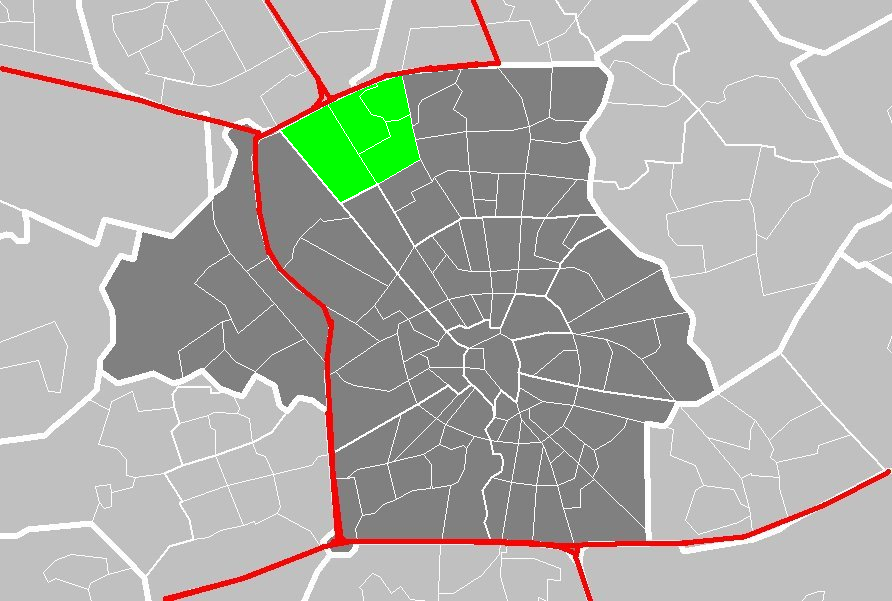
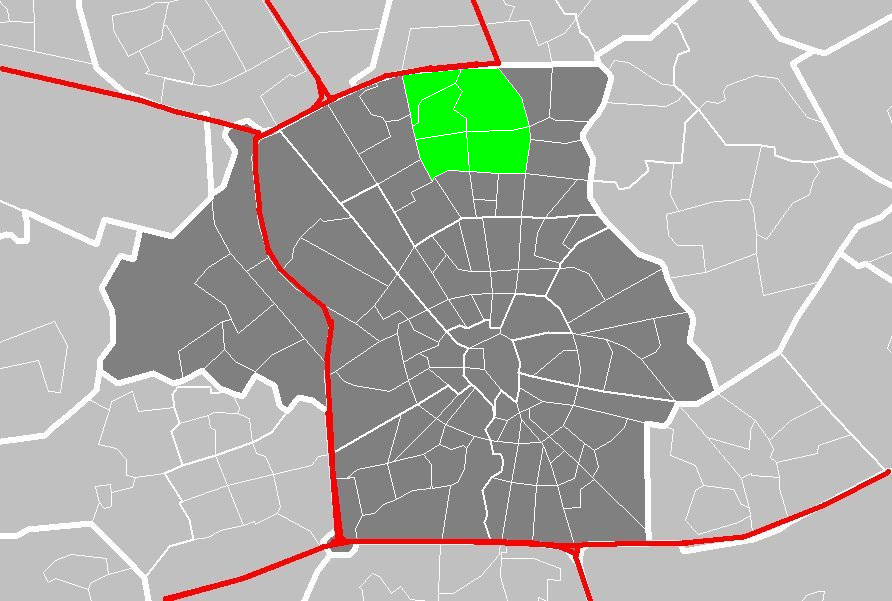
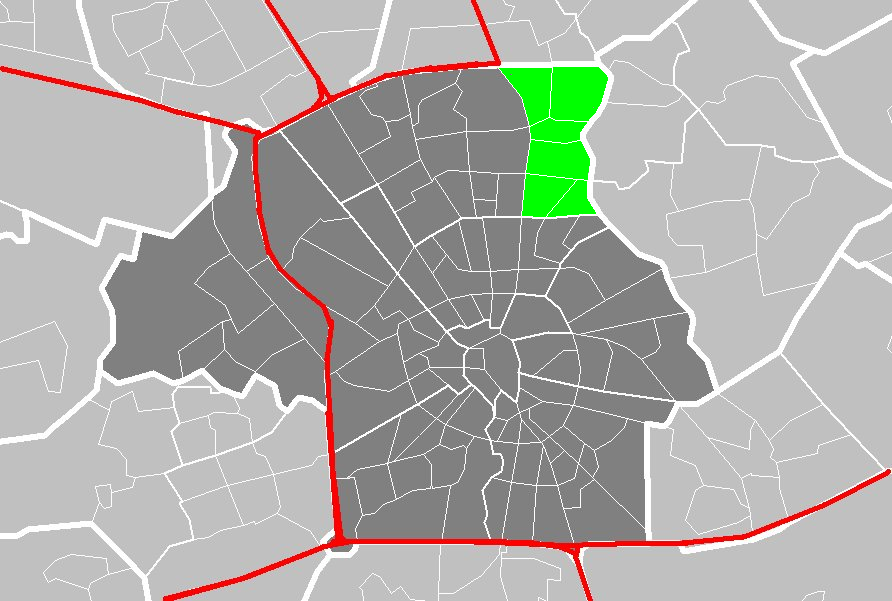
Quarter	Neighborhoods
Ontginning	Driehoeksbos
Ontginning	Prinsejagt
Ontginning	Jagershoef
Ontginning	't Hool
Ontginning	Winkelcentrum
Ontginning	Vlokhoven
Achtse Molen	Kerkdorp Acht
Achtse Molen	Achtse Barrier-Gunterslaer
Achtse Molen	Achtse Barrier-Spaaihoef
Achtse Molen	Achtse Barrier-Hoeven
Aanschot	Woenselse Heide
Aanschot	Tempel
Aanschot	Blixembosch-West
Aanschot	Blixembosch-Oost
Aanschot	Castiliëlaan
Dommelbeemd	Eckart
Dommelbeemd	Luytelaer
Dommelbeemd	Vaartbroek
Dommelbeemd	Heesterakker
Dommelbeemd	Esp
Dommelbeemd	Bokt

=== District Strijp ===
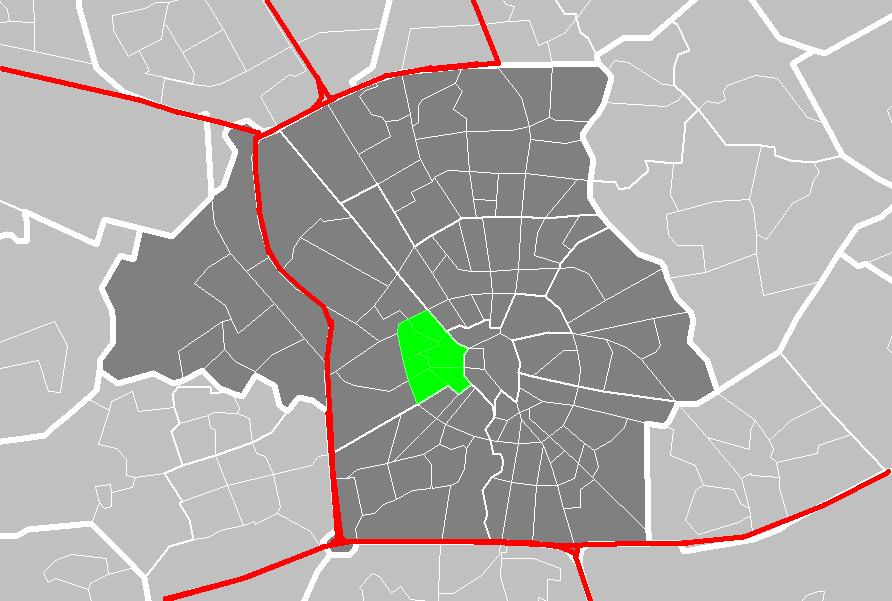
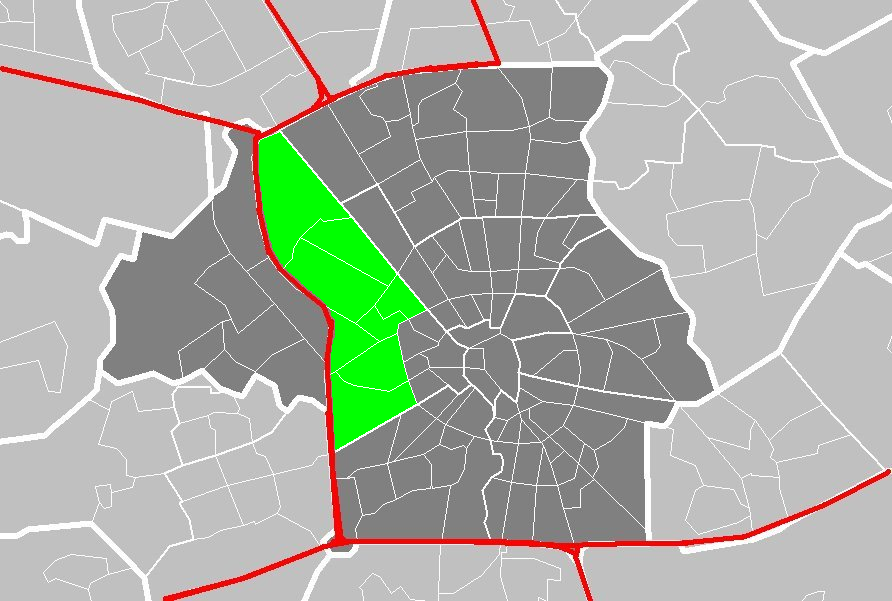
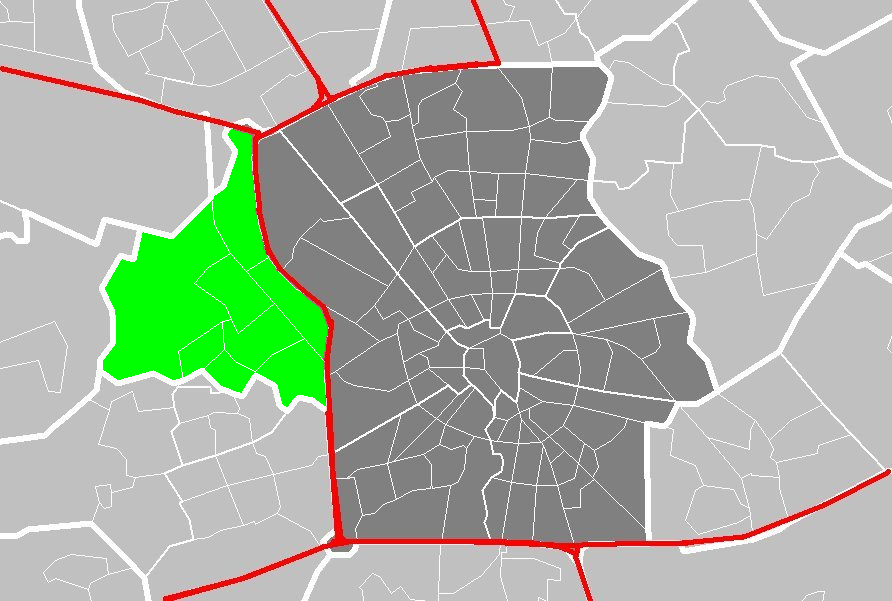
Quarter	Neighborhoods
Oud-Strijp	Eliasterrein, Vonderkwartier
Oud-Strijp	Philipsdorp
Oud-Strijp	Engelsbergen
Oud-Strijp	Schouwbroek
Oud-Strijp	Schoot
Oud-Strijp	Glaslaan (Strijp-S)
Halve Maan	Hurk
Halve Maan	Het Ven
Halve Maan	Lievendaal
Halve Maan	Drents Dorp
Halve Maan	Zwaanstraat (Strijp-R en T)
Halve Maan	Wielewaal
Halve Maan	Herdgang
Halve Maan	Mispelhoef
Meerhoven	BeA2
Meerhoven	Meerbos
Meerhoven	Grasrijk
Meerhoven	Bos- en Zandrijk
Meerhoven	Waterrijk
Meerhoven	Park Forum
Meerhoven	Flight Forum
Meerhoven	Eindhoven Airport

=== District Gestel ===
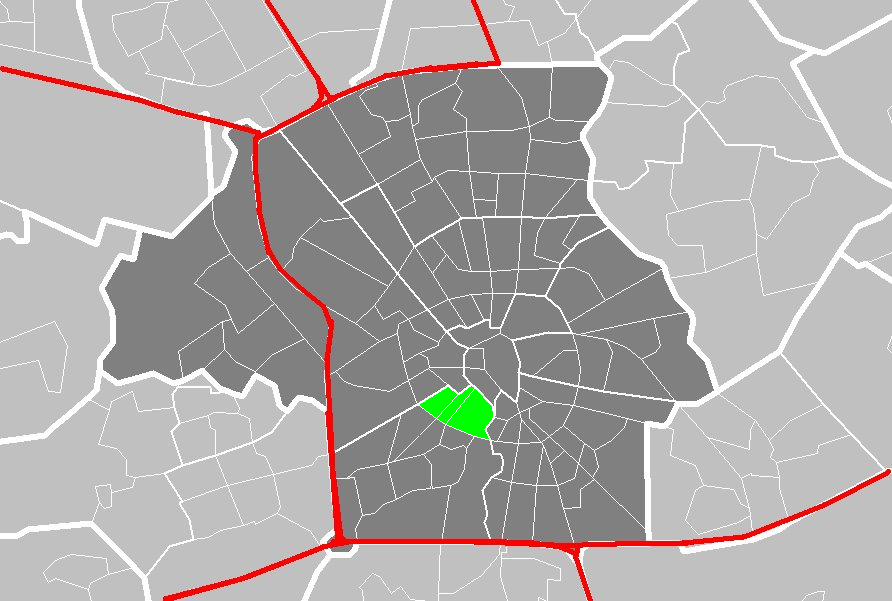
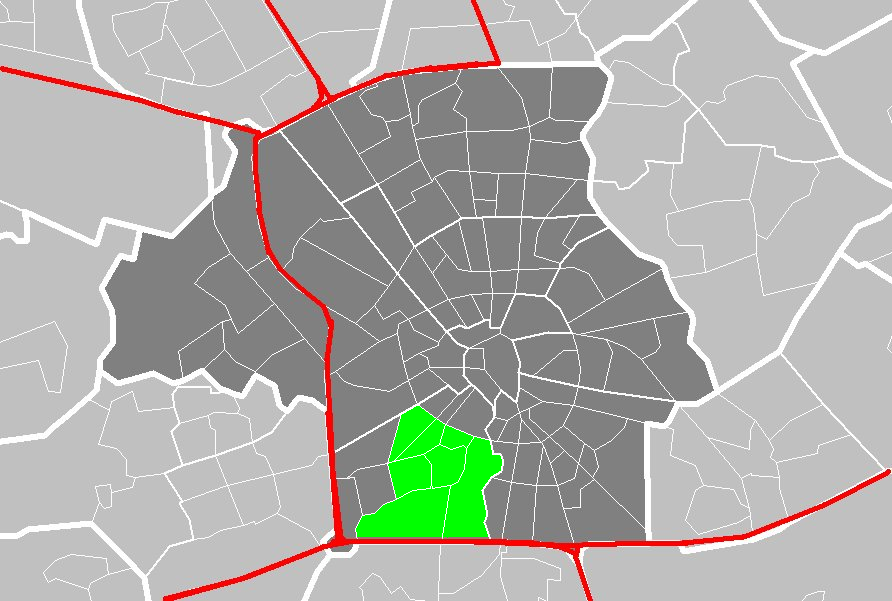
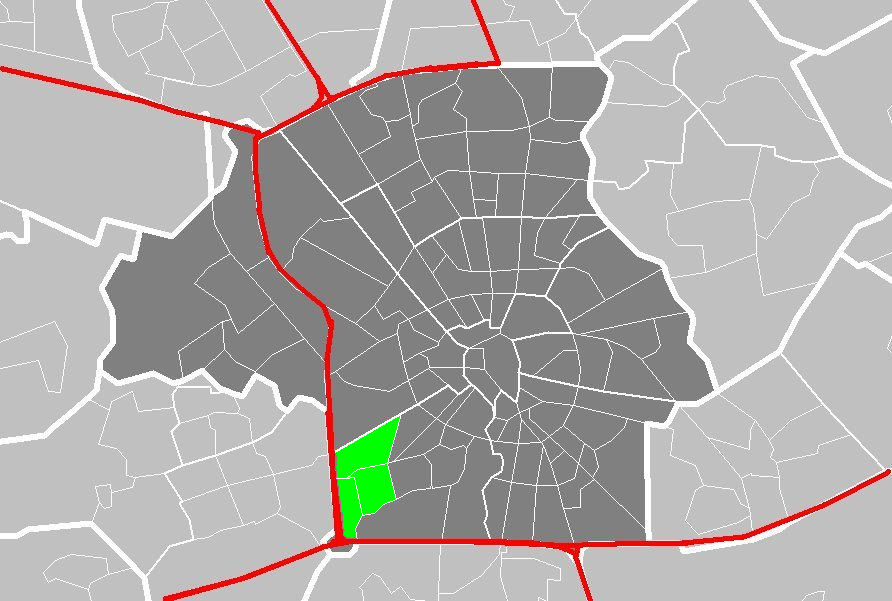
Quarter	Neighborhoods
Rozenknopje	Schrijversbuurt
Rozenknopje	Oude Spoorbaan
Rozenknopje	Hagenkamp
Oud-Gestel	Genderdal
Oud-Gestel	Blaarthem
Oud-Gestel	Rapelenburg
Oud-Gestel	Bennekel-Oost
Oud-Gestel	Bennekel-West, Gagelbosch
Oud-Gestel	Gennep
Oud-Gestel	Beemden
Oud Kasteel (Gestelse Ontginning)	Genderbeemd
Oud Kasteel (Gestelse Ontginning)	Hanevoet
Oud Kasteel (Gestelse Ontginning)	Ooievaarsnest
