= Gestel =

Gestel may refer to several places:

- Gestel, Netherlands, a former village near Eindhoven
  - Gestel en Blaarthem, a former municipality near Eindhoven, now a neighbourhood of that city
- Gestel, Berlaar, in Berlaar Antwerp, Belgium
- Gestel, Meerhout, Meerhout Antwerp, Belgium
- Gestel, Lummen, Lummen Limburg, Belgium
- Gestel, Meeuwen, Meeuwen Limburg, Belgium
- Gestel, Morbihan, Morbihan France
