= Ooievaarsnest =

Stork's Nest Ooievaarsnest
- Neighborhood
- Nickname: Het Uivernestje
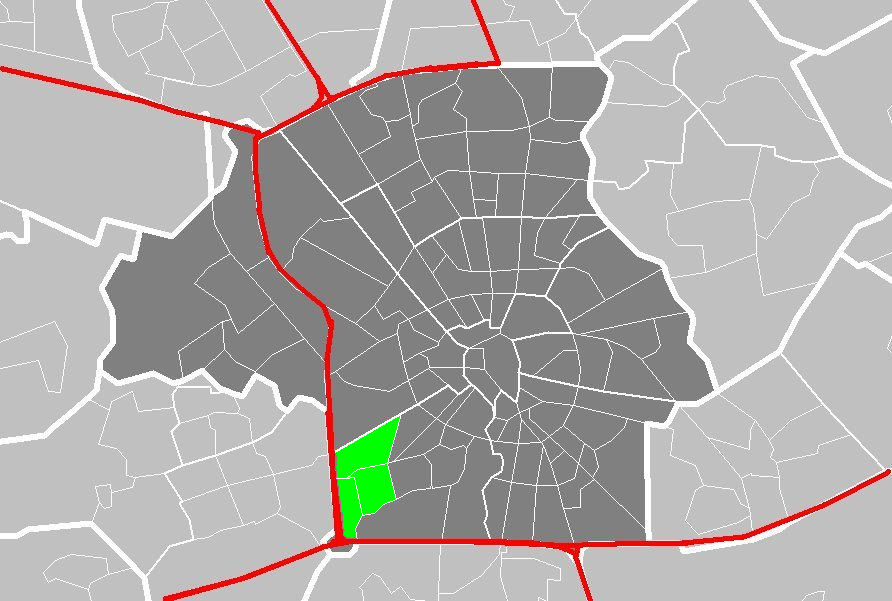
- The quarter Oud-Kasteel
- Coordinates: 51°24′51″N 5°26′01″E
- Established: 1975

Area
  - Total: 0.87 km^{2} (0.34 sq mi)

Population (1 January 2010)
  - Total: 917
  - Density: 1,100/km^{2} (2,700/sq mi)
- Time zone: CET
- Website: www.ooievaarsnest.info (Neighborhood association)

Ooievaarsnest is a neighborhood in Eindhoven, Netherlands. The neighborhood is located in the quarter of Oud Kasteel and district of Gestel, in the extreme southwest of the city and adjoins the southwestern city limits. It is separated from Veldhoven only by the A2 motorway.

The name of the neighborhood literally means "stork's nest". The neighborhood was named after a 15th-century farm that was located within the area. This farm was torn down around 1970 to make way for new housing, after which housing construction commenced around 1975. Construction started with the Ontginningsweg (litt. Land reclamation road), which was originally laid as a service road for construction vehicles, and moved outward from there in two directions.

Images from the neighborhood

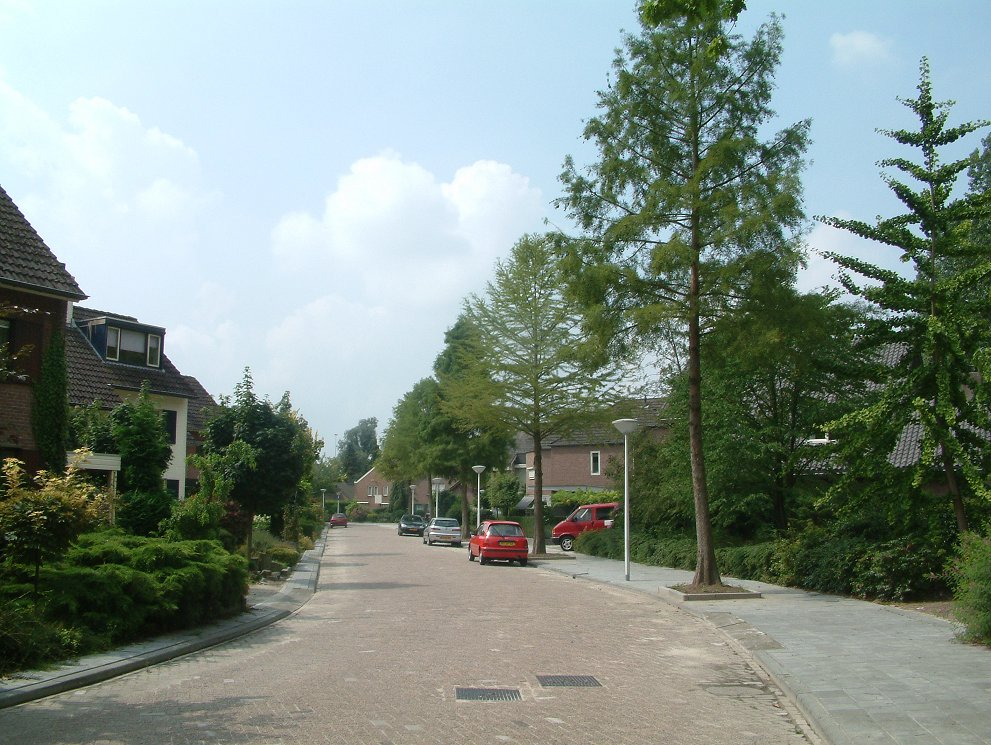
Looking westward down the Twickel, from the corner of the Rooswijck

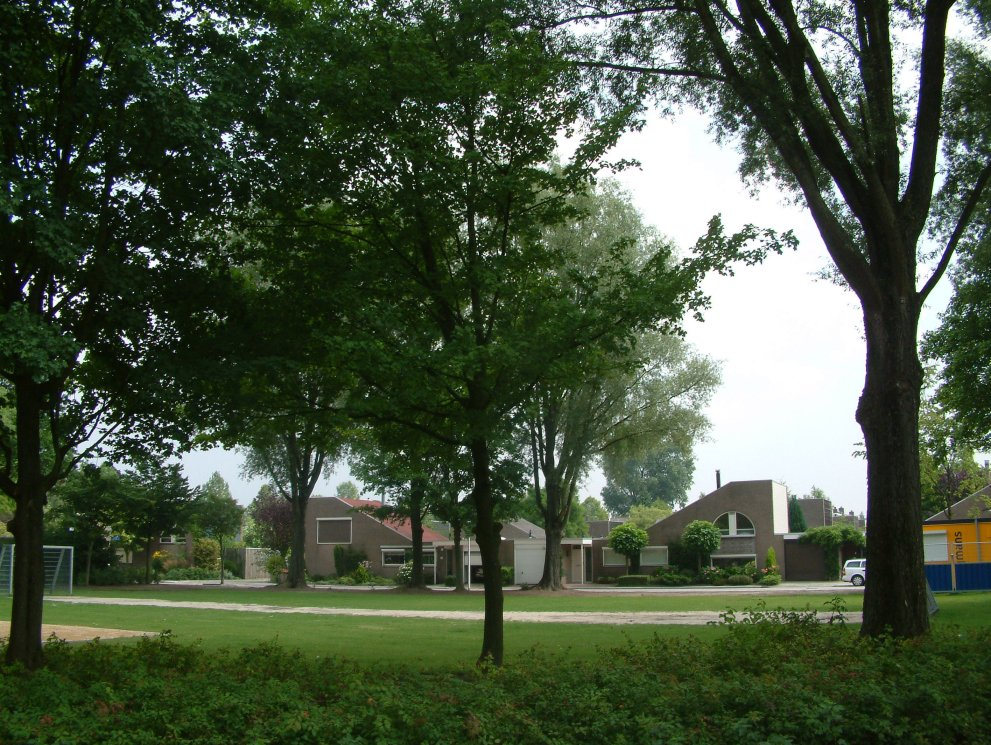
Overlooking the neighborhood playground, between the Rooswijck, the Twickel, the Soetendaal and the bicycle path.

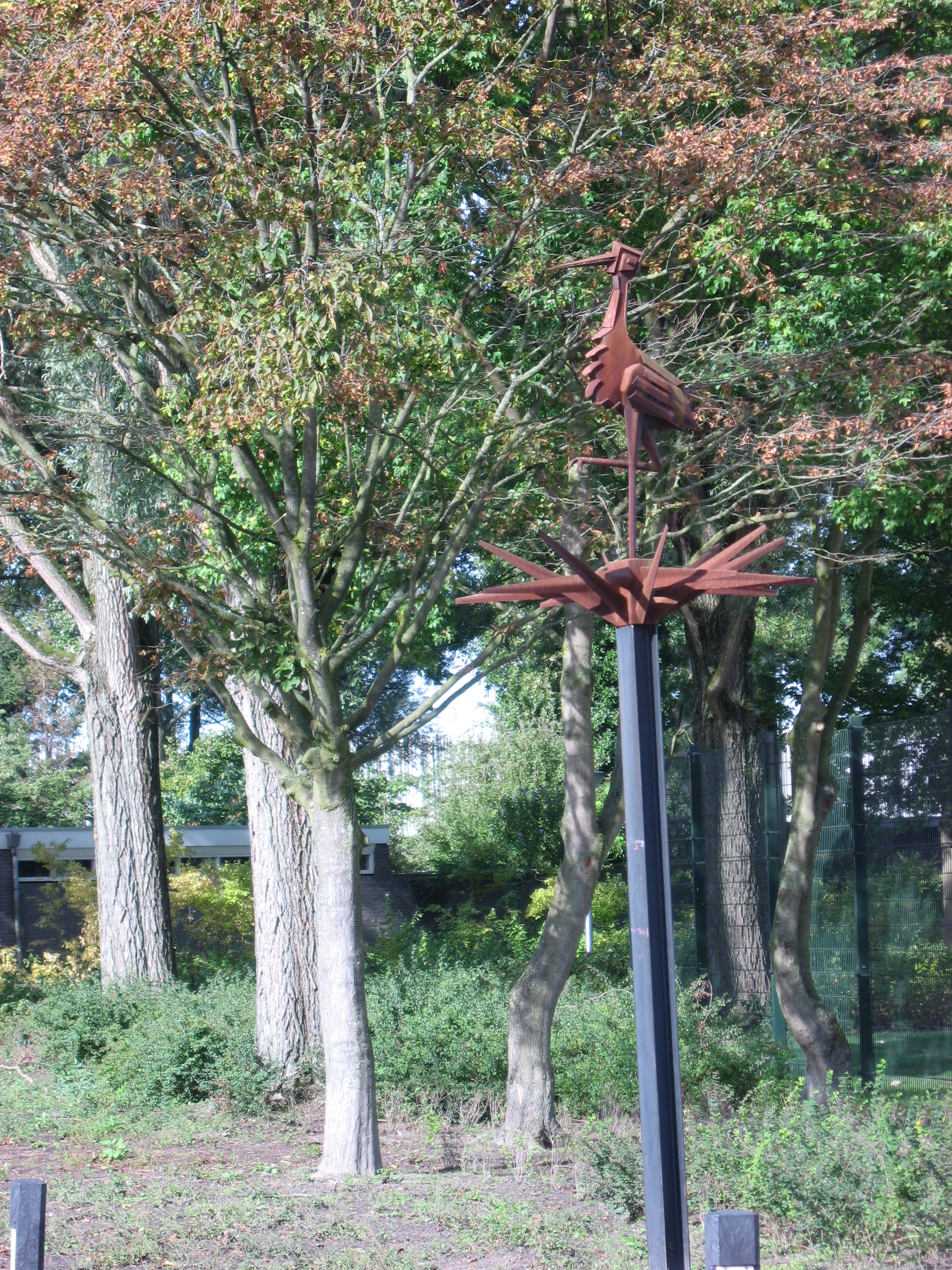
The sculpture de Ooievaar, an anniversary gift from the neighborhood association to the neighborhood in 1995

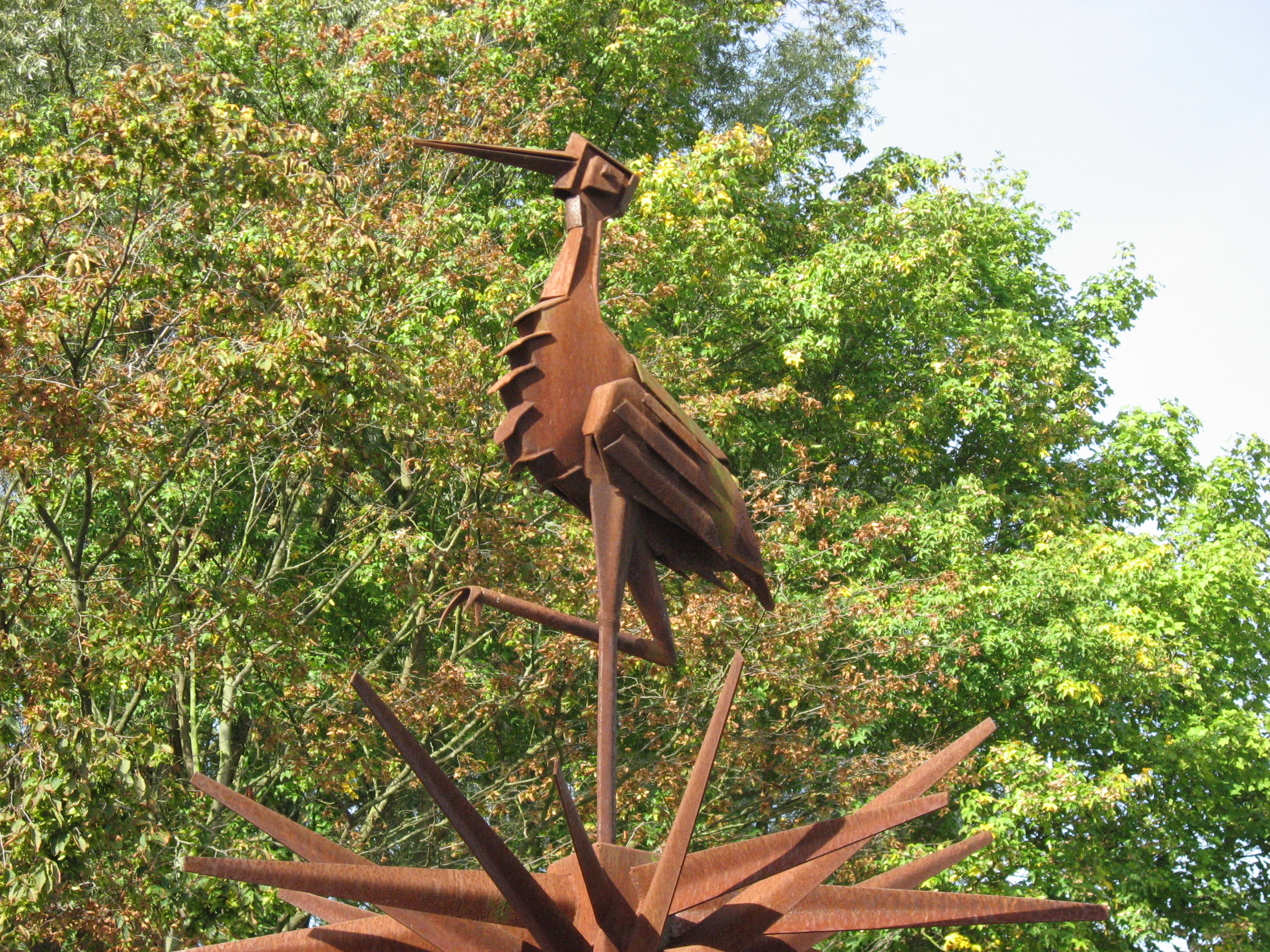
Closeup of de Ooievaar
