= Water Mill at Gennep =

Painting series by Vincent van Gogh

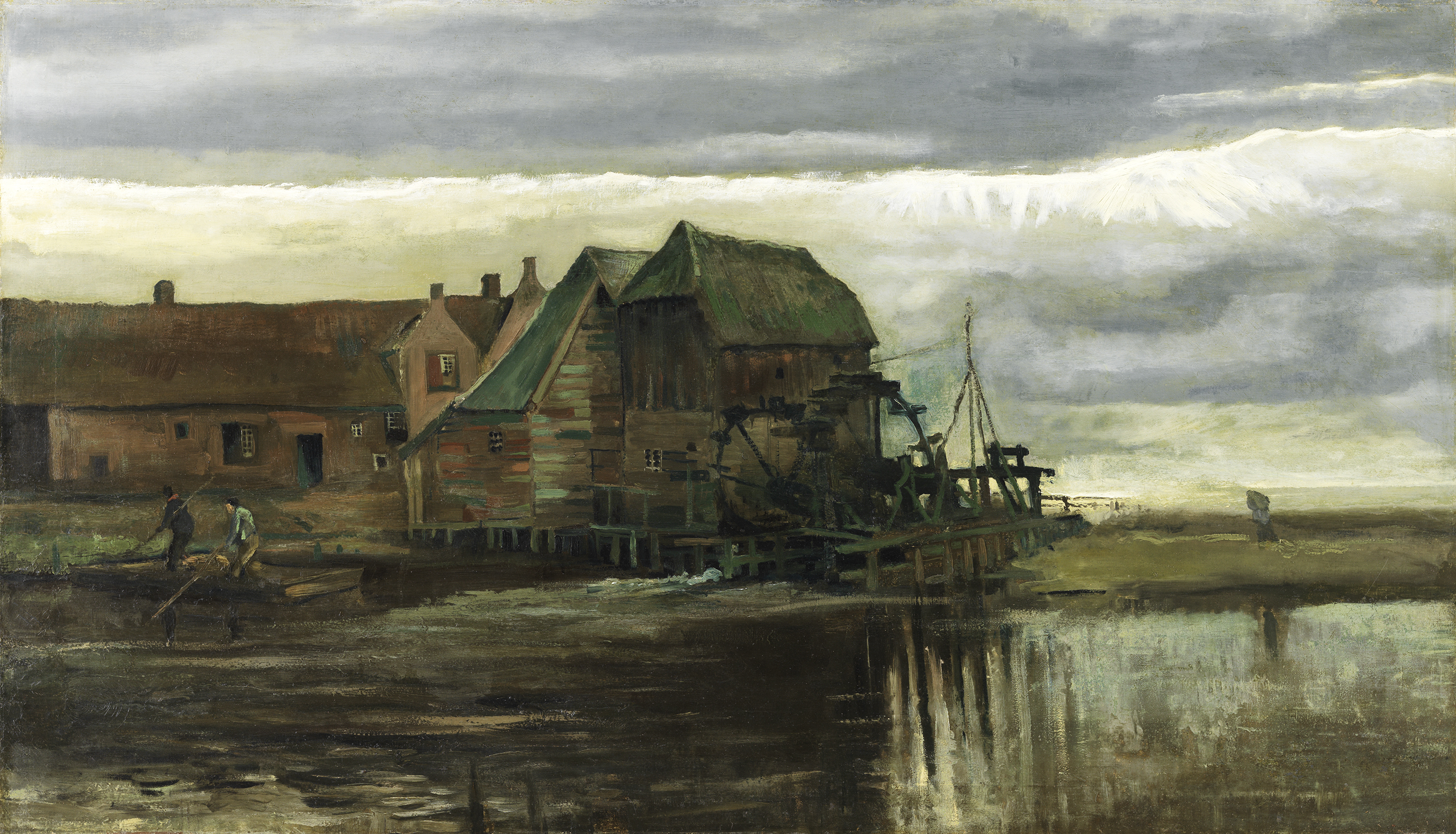
- Artist: Vincent van Gogh
- Year: 1884
- Catalogue: F125; JH525
- Medium: oil on canvas
- Dimensions: 85 cm × 151 cm (33 in × 59 in)
- Location: Thyssen-Bornemisza Museum, Madrid

Water Mill at Gennep is the subject and title of three oil paintings and a watercolor created in 1884 by Vincent van Gogh. The Watermill at Gennep is situated in Gennep, today a neighbourhood of Eindhoven (North Brabant, not to be confused with the city of Gennep in Limburg).

Van Gogh painted Water Mill at Gennep (F125) in November, 1884. He wrote to his brother, Theo: "Yesterday I brought home that study of the water mill at Gennep, which I painted with pleasure, and which has procured me a new friend in Eindhoven [Anton Kerssemakers], who passionately wants to learn to paint, and to whom I paid a visit, after which we set to work at once." Van Gogh also made a watercolor of the Water Mill at Gennep (F1144a) in mid-November, 1884.

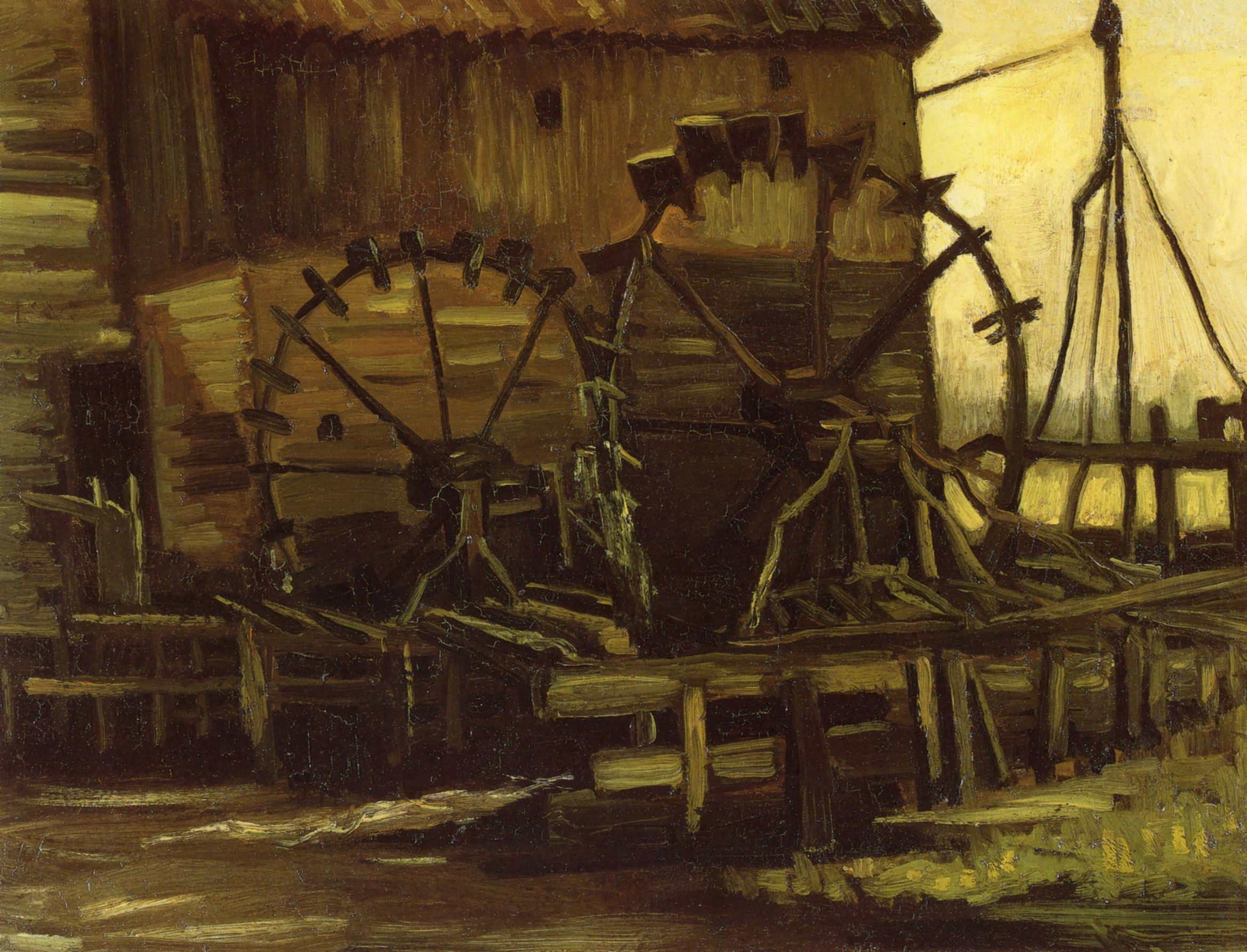
Water Mill at Gennep, 1884, Noordbrabants Museum, 's-Hertogenbosch, Netherlands - on loan from the Netherlands Office for Fine Arts (F46)

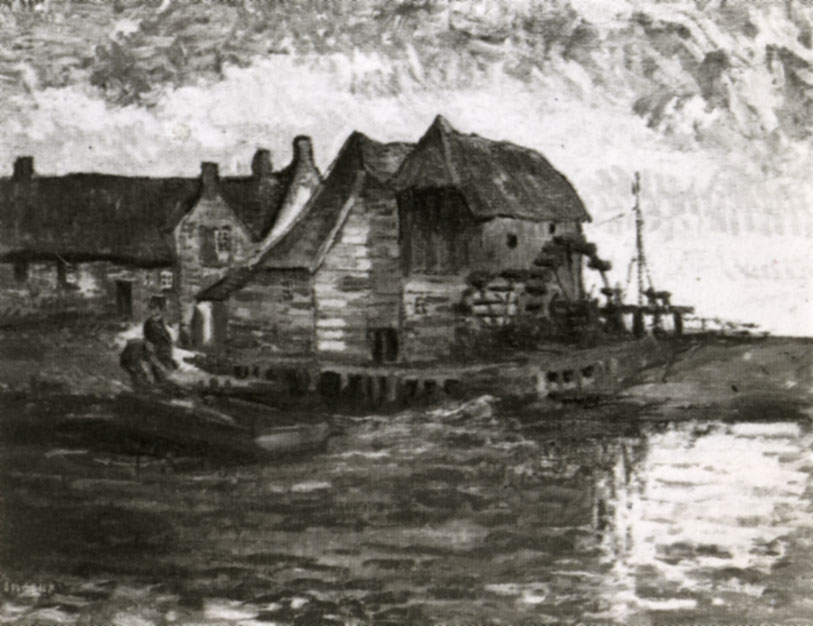
Water Mill at Gennep, 1884, private collection (F47) - black and white reproduction

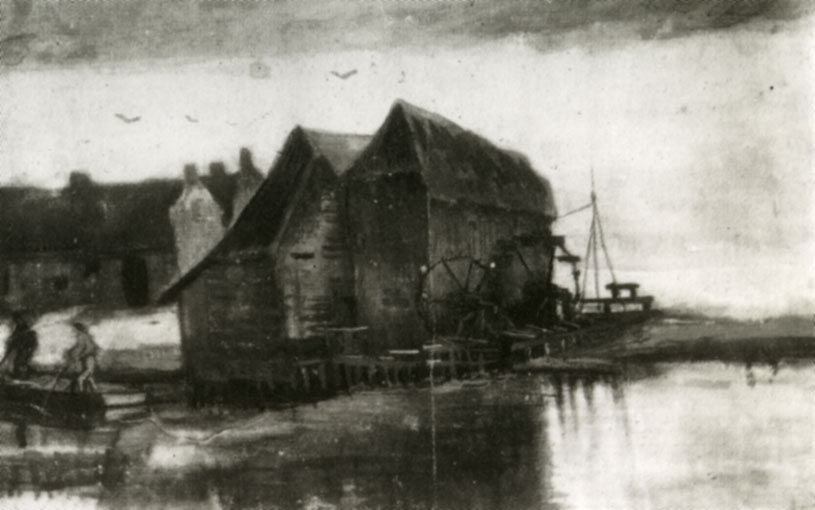
Water Mill at Gennep, 1884, (F1144a)

== See also ==
- List of works by Vincent van Gogh
