= Watermill at Gennep =

National Historic Site in the Netherlands

- Genneper Watermolen
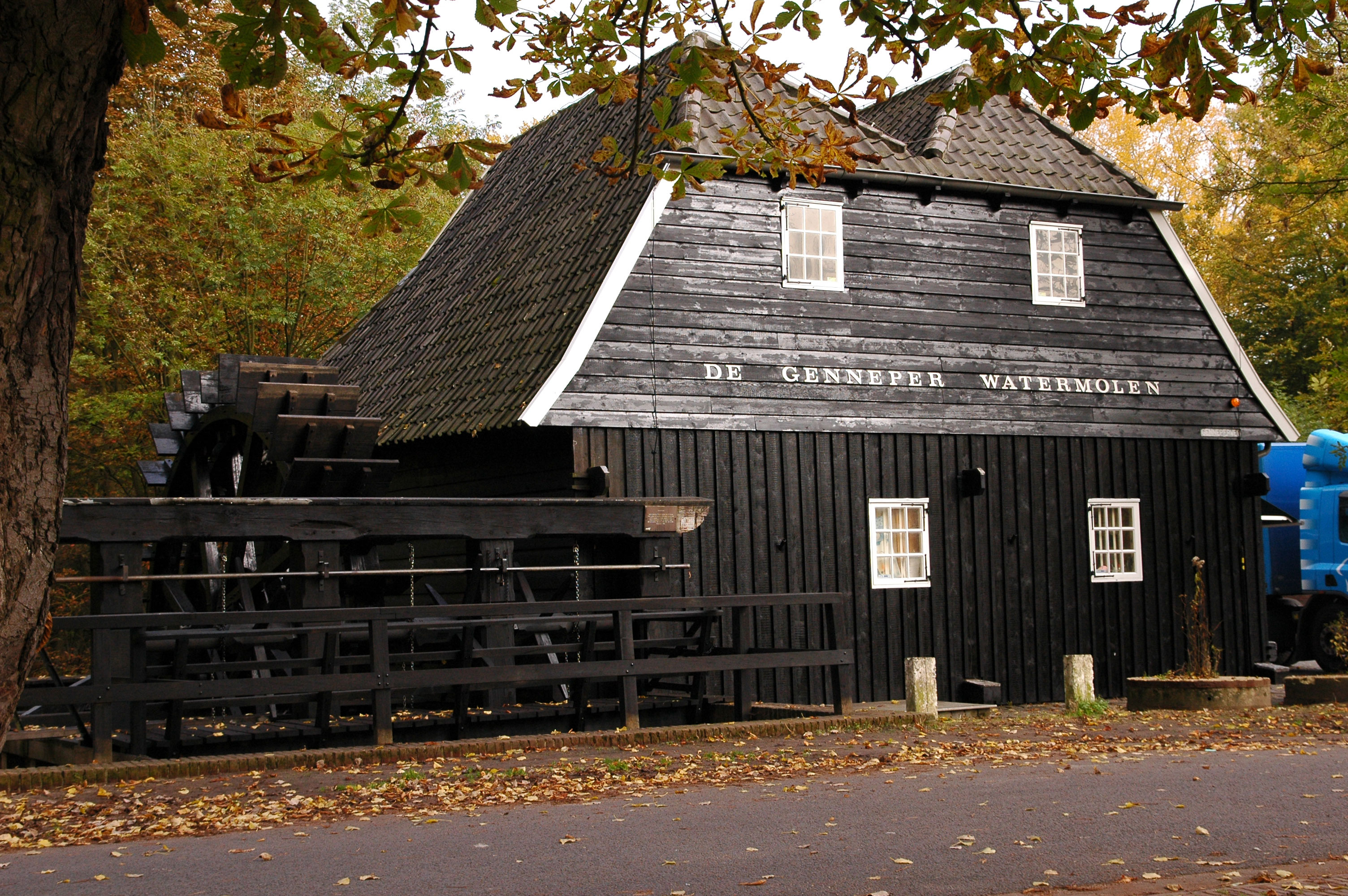
- Watermill at Gennep in 2007

General information
- Status: Rijksmonument (14639)
- Type: Watermill
- Address: Genneperweg 143; 5644 RS, Gestel
- Town or city: Eindhoven
- Country: Netherlands
- Coordinates: 51.423056°N 5.47°E
- Completed: 1587
- Designations: Gristmill, oil mill, fulling mill

References
- Database of Mills; De Hollandsche Molen

The Watermill at Gennep (Dutch: Genneper Watermolen) is a watermill along the river Dommel, located on the Genneperweg 143 in Gestel, Eindhoven, in the province of North Brabant, Netherlands. First mentioned in the 13th century, the watermill burned down and was rebuilt in 1587.

Vincent van Gogh lived nearby and made several paintings while in the area, including four paintings of the mill in 1884. The watermill was listed as a national monument in 1972.

== History ==
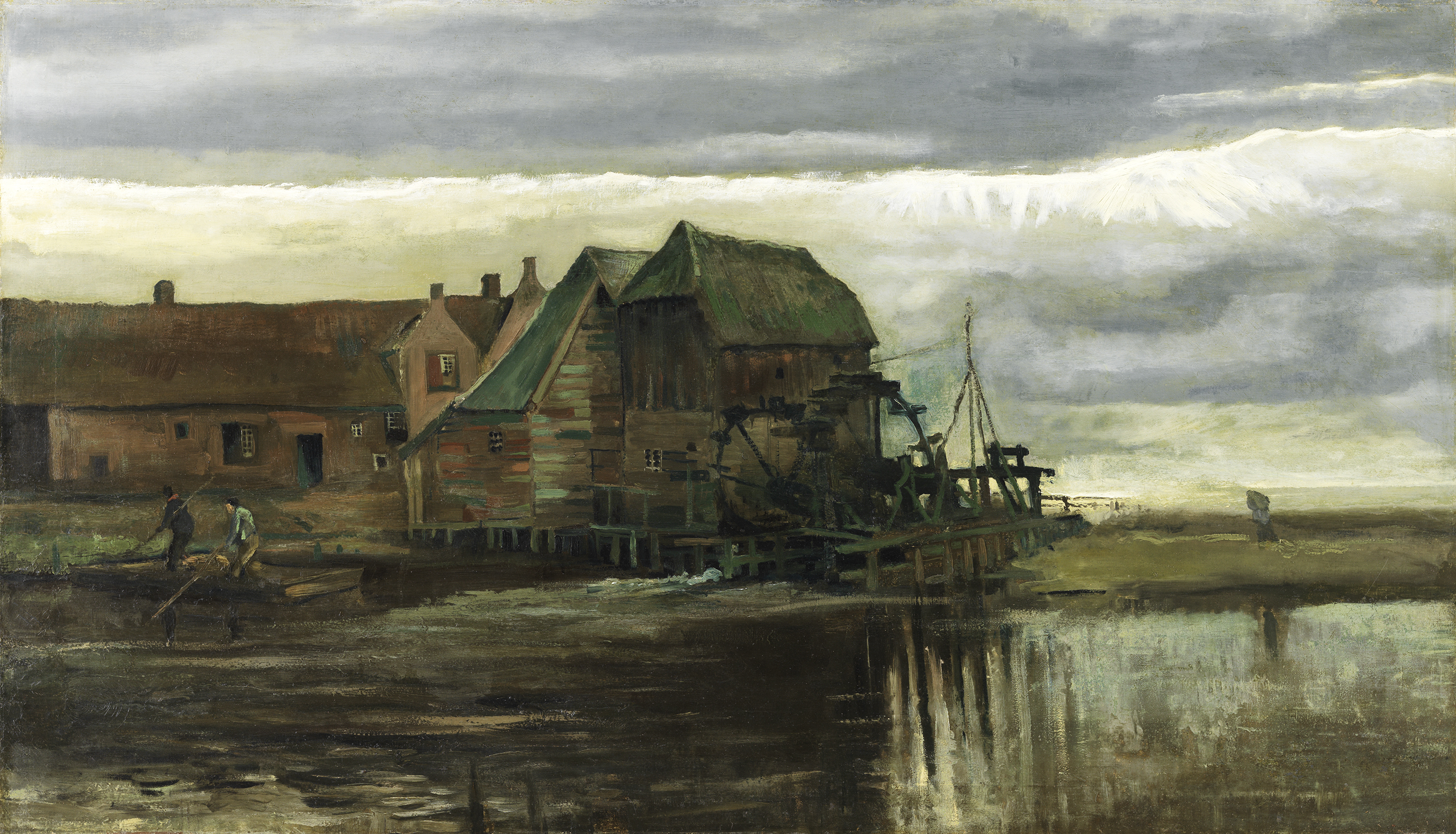
Water Mill at Gennep, by Vincent van Gogh, 1884 (F125)

The gristmill was first mentioned in a document in the 13th century, donating the mill to the Postel Abbey in Mol, Belgium. It was a banmolen (nl), meaning peasants in the locality were obligated to use this mill to grind their wheat.

== Description ==
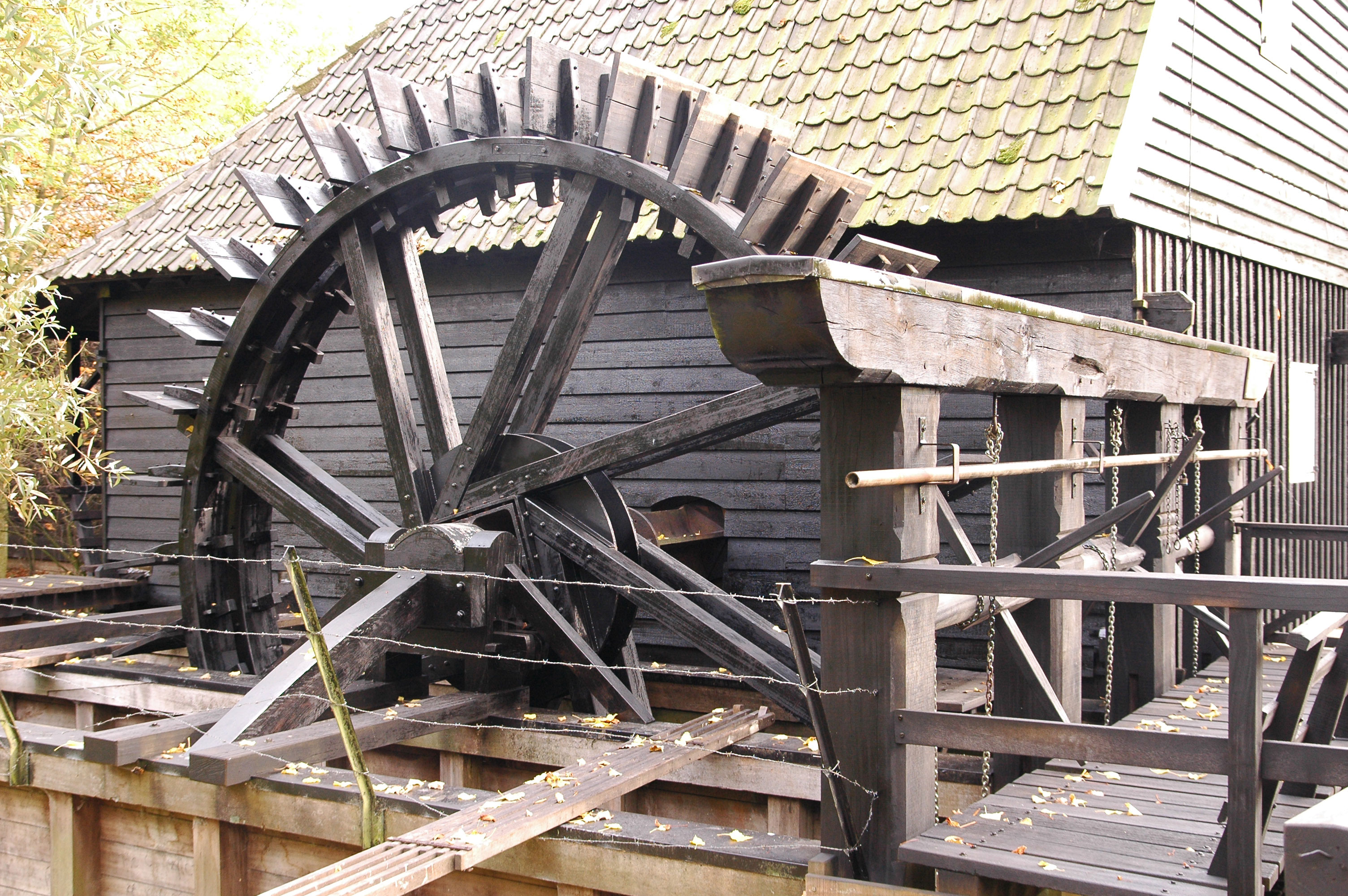
Close up of the water wheel.

The Watermill at Gennep is situated along the river Dommel.

== Modern day ==
The mill was listed as a national monument (nr 14639) on 15 August 1972.
