= Gestel, Netherlands =

Borough of Eindhoven, Netherlands

Coordinates: 51°25′30″N 5°27′42″E

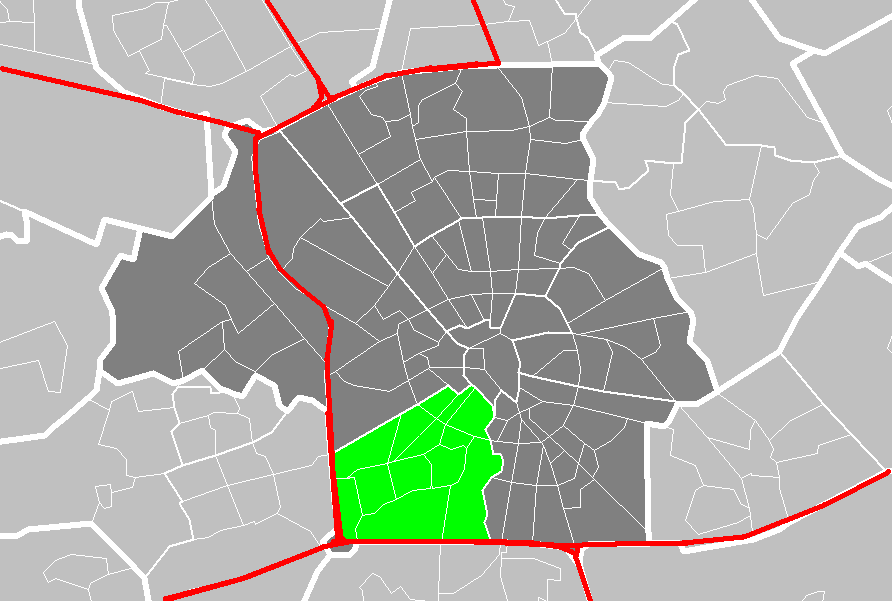
Map of Eindhoven, with Gestel in green

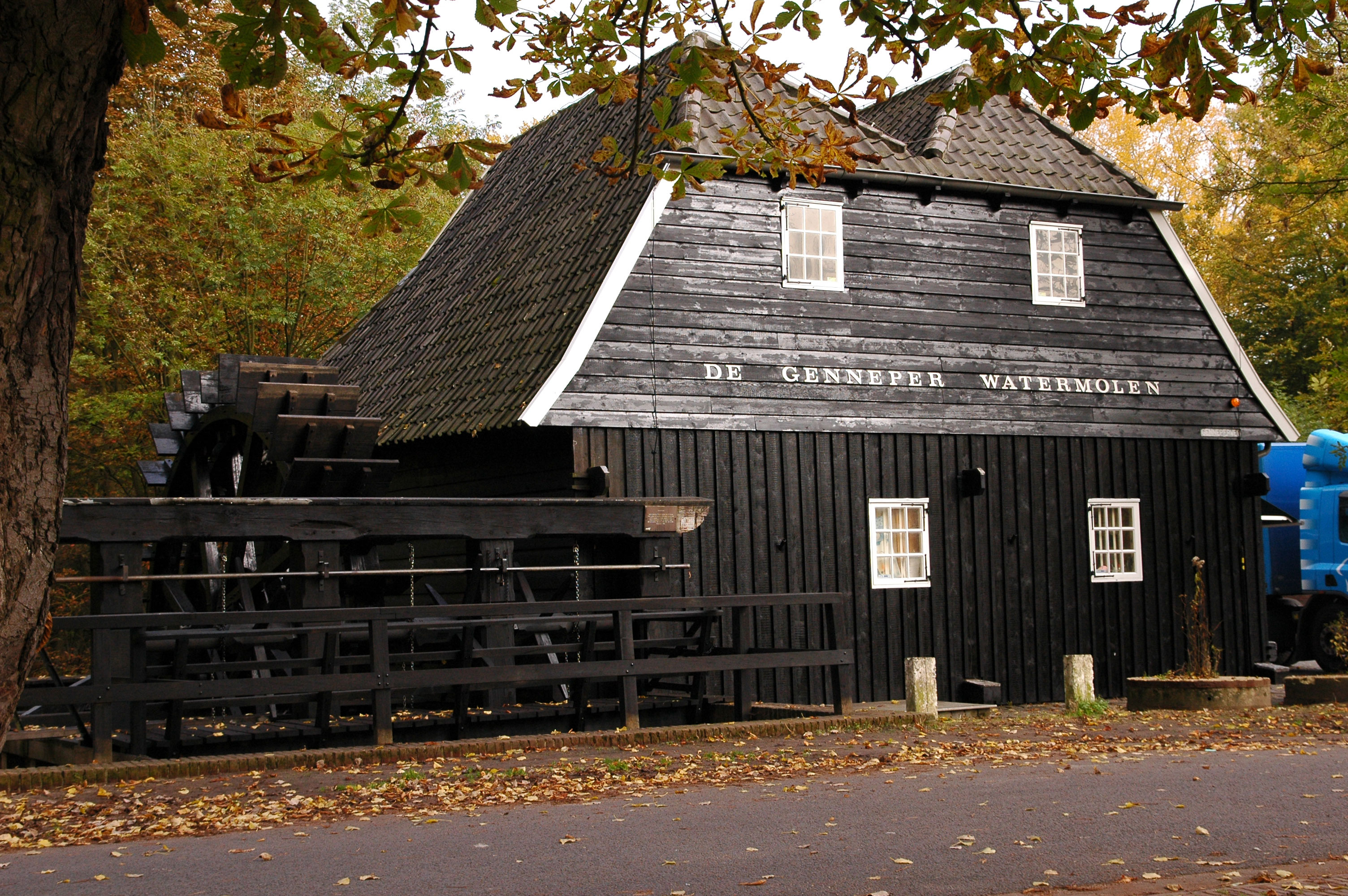
Watermill at Gennep, in Gestel

Gestel is a borough in the southwestern part of the city of Eindhoven, Netherlands. Gestel used to be a separate village, and until 1920 was part of the separate municipality of Gestel en Blaarthem.

On 1 January 2005 it had a population of nearly 27,000 people. Gestel consists of three neighbourhoods: Rozenknopje (with Hagekamp, Oude Spoorbaan and Schrijversbuurt), Oud Gestel (with Rapelenburg, Bennekel, Blaarthem, Genderdal, Gennep and de Beemden) and Oud Kasteel (with Genderbeemd, Ooievaarsnest and Hanevoet). Gestel borders other parts of Eindhoven (Strijp, Stratum and Eindhoven Centrum, which is the pre-1920 municipality of Eindhoven, with minor adjustments) and the municipalities of Waalre and Veldhoven.
