= Meerhoven =

- quarter
- Interactive map of Meerhoven
- Established: 1997

Area
  - Total: 15.39 km^{2} (5.94 sq mi)

Population (1 January 2024)
  - Total: 13,125
  - Density: 852.8/km^{2} (2,209/sq mi)
- Time zone: UTC+1 (CET)
- Website: http://www.meerhoven.nl/

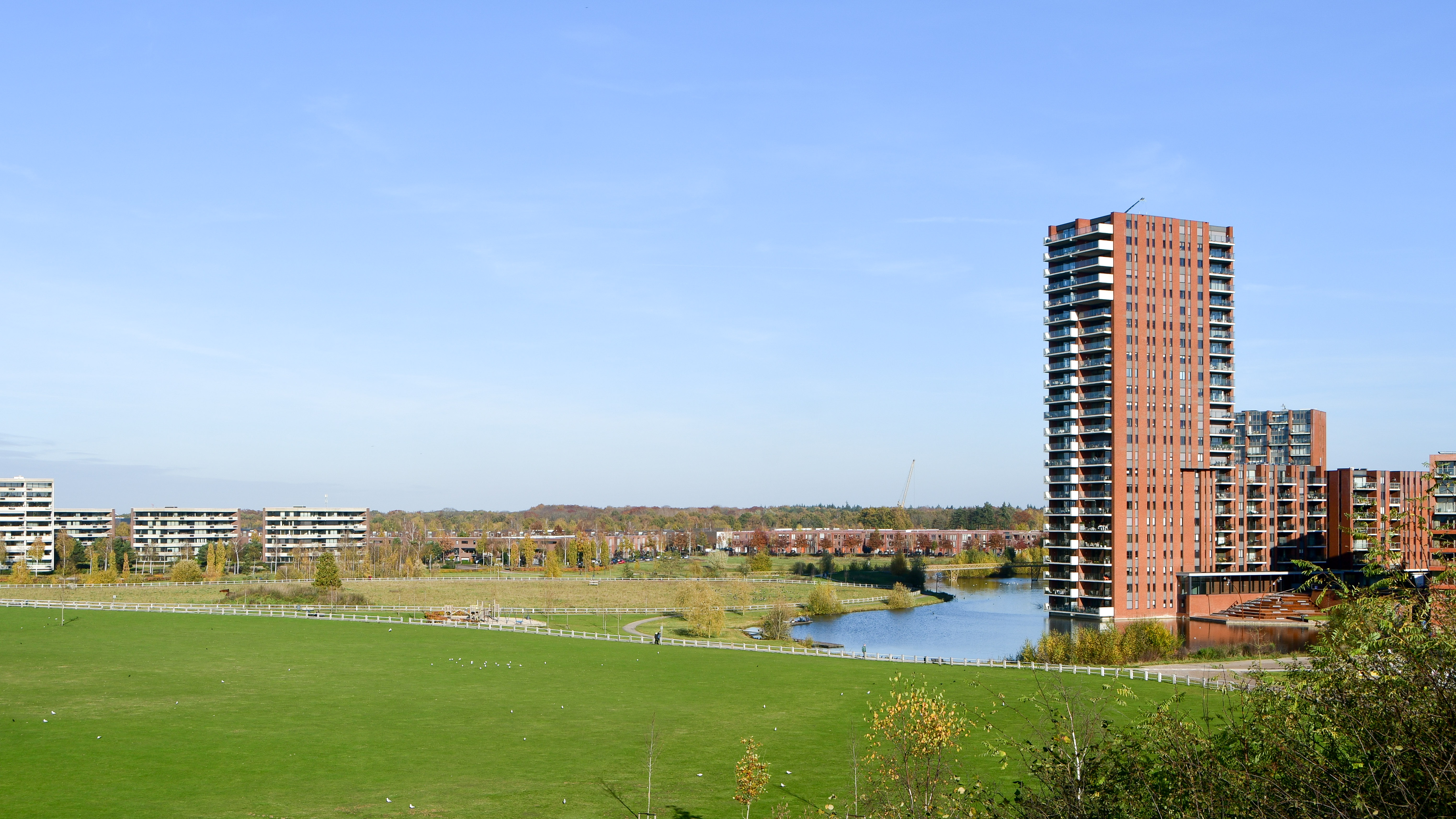

Meerhoven is a city quarter in the Dutch city of Eindhoven. It is the newest quarter of the city and a Vinex-location, which has been under development since 1997.

The development of Meerhoven was started to deal with the shortage of housing in Eindhoven in the 1990s (and it was also part of the general Vinex urban development projects started around that time). In order to facilitate growth of the city, a significant rezoning of the southeast of the province of North Brabant was undertaken, in which part of the territory of the town of Veldhoven was added to Eindhoven. Also, the local airport Welschap was moved west and renamed Eindhoven Airport. The Meerhoven project was then started to develop the now vacated and available land. A large tract of the Meerhoven area was formerly the PIROC terrain (Pantser Infanterie RijOpleidingsCentrum, English Armored Infantry Drivers Training Center).

Meerhoven is located on the northwestern part of Eindhoven (north of the current territory of Veldhoven) and spans the Eindhoven territory west of the A2 motorway. The quarter is part of the district of Strijp. As of 2024 the quarter houses 13125 people.

The term "Meerhoven" is often used to refer to the residential parts of the quarter, i.e., the neighborhoods Bosrijk, Grasrijk, Meerrijk, Waterrijk and Zandrijk. However, Meerhoven also includes the industrial areas Flight en Park Forum, Nimbus, Land Forum and Trade Forum, as well as the land of Eindhoven Airport. Moreover, the area known as BeA2, the Meerbos and the former Golfclub Welschap are part of Meerhoven.

Before the actual building started, a lot of time was spent thoroughly searching the grounds for leftover explosives from World War II, which are found in the area regularly.

The Meerhoven district is located within the municipality of Eindhoven. The most common postcode in the Meerhoven district is postcode 5658.

There are 5,961 addresses and 5,239 homes in the Meerhoven district in the municipality of Eindhoven. 72% of the homes in the district are owner-occupied. The homes have an average value of €492,000. There are 13,215 residents in the Meerhoven district, with a significant portion (32%) in the age group of 25 to 45 years. The Meerhoven district has 5,270 households with an average of 2.5 people. Furthermore, there are 5,700 passenger cars and 1,790 business establishments registered in the Meerhoven district.

The Meerhoven district has a total area of 1,587 hectares, of which 1,552 hectares of land and 34 hectares of water (one hundred hectares is one square kilometre, 1 km^{2}). The average density of addresses is 1,269 addresses per km^{2}.

Information based on the BAG (Basic Registration of Addresses and Buildings of the Land Registry) of 1 January 2025. The Meerhoven district has a total of 5,961 addresses, with 5,943 residential objects and 18 pitches (there are no moorings). 99% of the addresses in the Meerhoven district are located within the built-up area and 1% of the addresses are located outside the built-up area.The BAG contains the official data of all addresses and buildings in the Netherlands. In addition to all addresses, the BAG also registers all buildings, residential objects, pitches and moorings.Purposes of residential objects are part of the BAG registration. They indicate how a residential object is used. For example, a home has the purpose of "Residential function". 11 categories have been defined for the purposes of use. Different purposes of use can be assigned to one object. An example is a residential object in which a farm is housed. This object can have both an "industrial function" and a "residential function". And a residential object in which a company is housed can have an "office function" in addition to the purpose of "industrial function".

In 2024, the origin of residents in the Meerhoven district was divided as follows: origin from the Netherlands: 50%, origin from European countries: 13% and origin from countries outside Europe: 37%. And in 2013, the distribution of residents by area of origin was as follows: origin from the Netherlands: 75%, origin from Europe: 6.6% and origin from outside Europe: 19
