= Gestel en Blaarthem =

Coordinates: 51°25′30″N 5°27′42″E

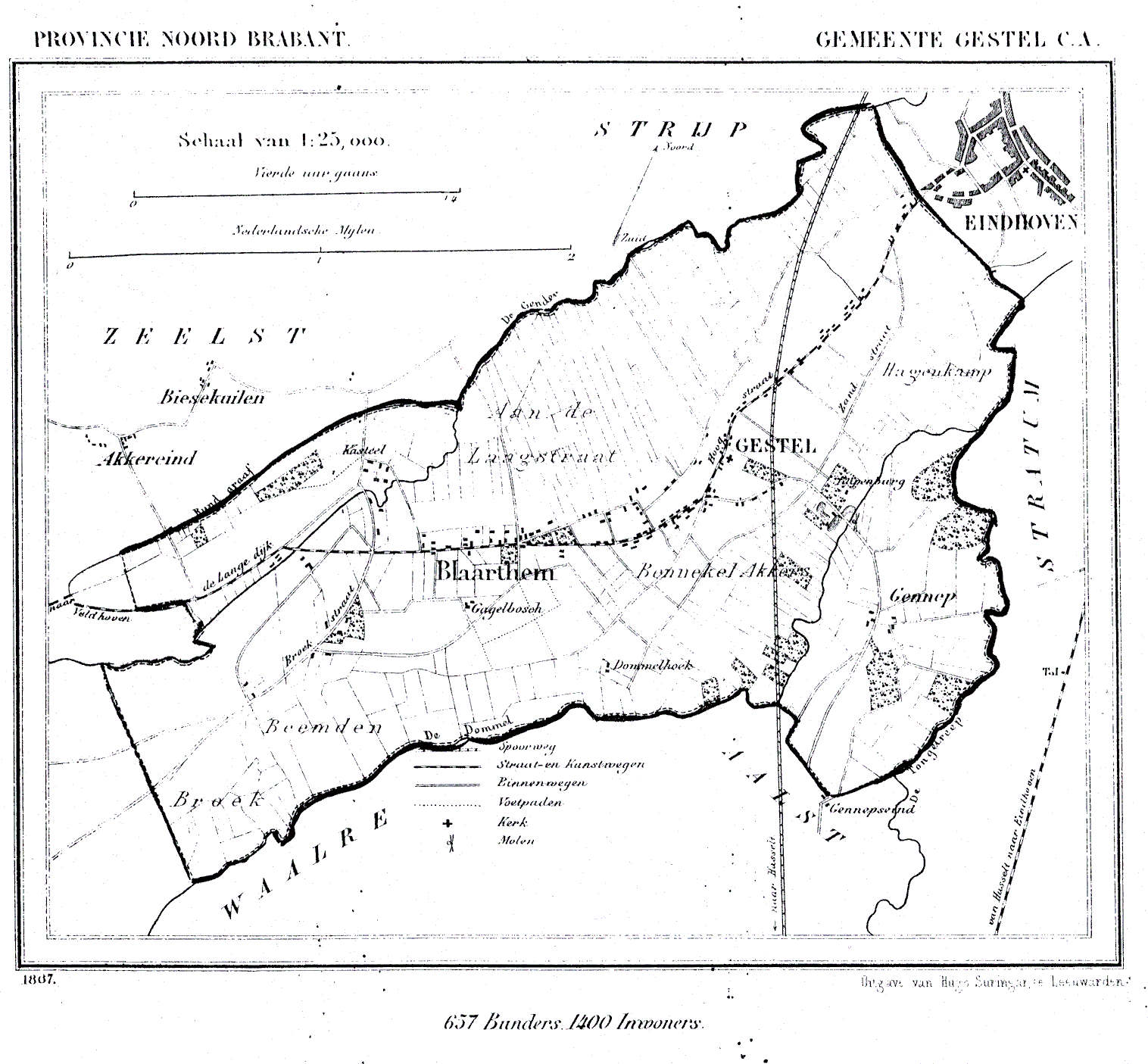
Map of Gestel en Blaarthem in 1867

Coat of arm of Gestel en Blaarthem

Gestel en Blaarthem is a former municipality of the Netherlands. The municipality was made up of the villages of Gestel and Blaarthem. On 1 Januari 1920 the municipality merged with the municipality of Eindhoven, together with the former municipalities of Stratum, Strijp, Tongelre and Woensel.

== Mayors of Gestel en Blaarthem ==
Period	Name of Mayor
18?? - 1834	Henricus Johannes van der Waerden
1834 - 1874	Jan Moonen
1874 - 1910	Egidius Henricus van Gennip
1910 - 1918	Theodorus Carolus Petrus Maria Kolfschoten
1918 - 1920	Martinus Godefridus van den Hurk (acting)

== See also ==
- Gestel
