= Reactions to the November 2015 Paris attacks =

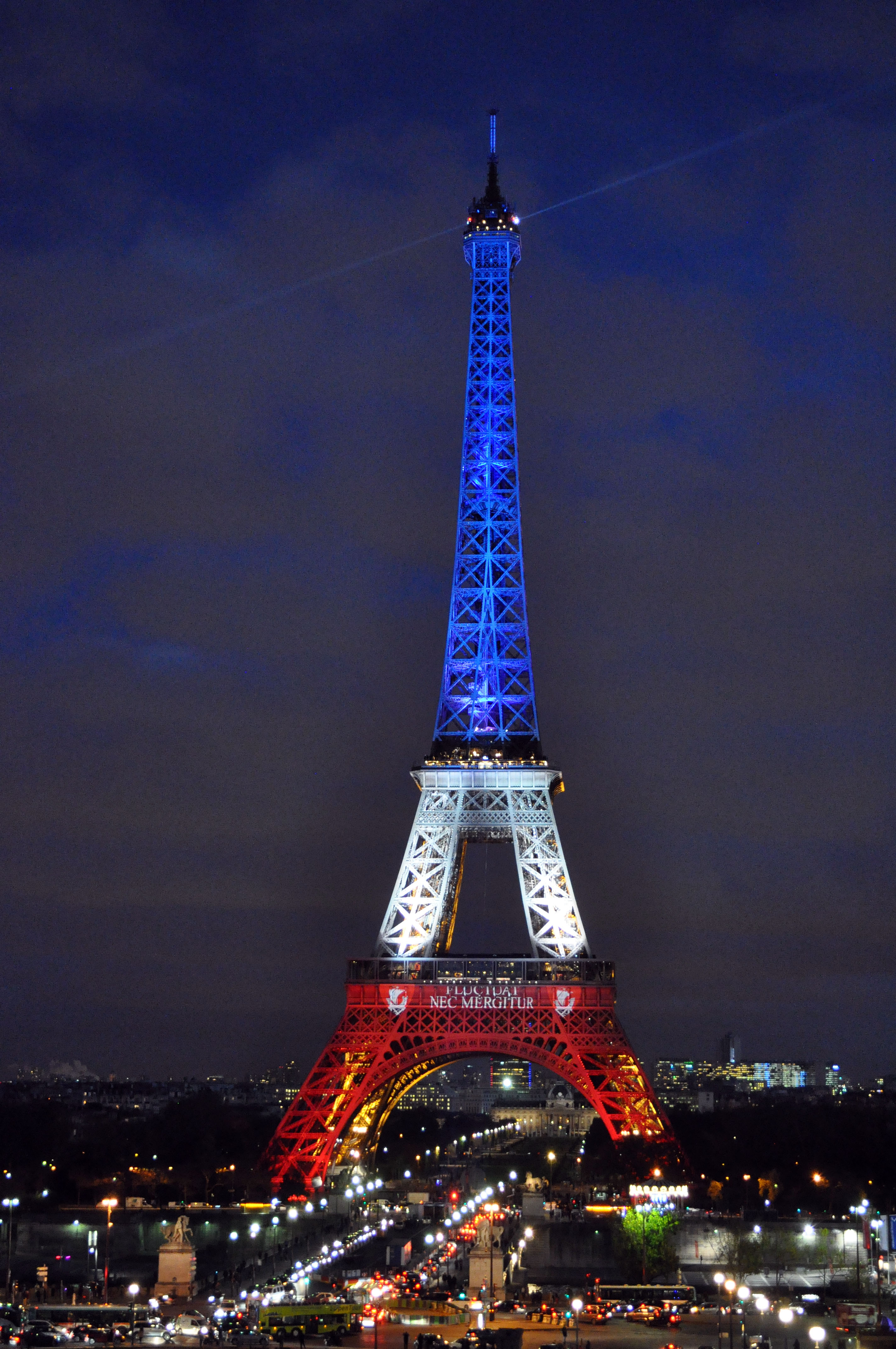
Eiffel Tower illuminated in the colours of French flag after the attacks

On the night of 13 November 2015, Paris suffered a series of terror attacks. In reaction to those events, many individuals, governments, and other organisations around the world expressed their solidarity with France and with the victims. Many world leaders issued statements, mostly strongly condemning the attacks and vowing to stand by and support France. Public vigils took place in many international cities, and a number of world landmarks were illuminated in the colours of the French flag. Members of the public expressed their solidarity through social media by sharing images, notably the "Peace for Paris" symbol, designed by the French graphic designer Jean Jullien, and through the slogans, "Pray for Paris" and "Je suis Paris" (itself a reference to the phrase "Je suis Charlie", which was shared widely in the aftermath of the Charlie Hebdo shootings in Paris on 7 January 2015).

== International organisations ==
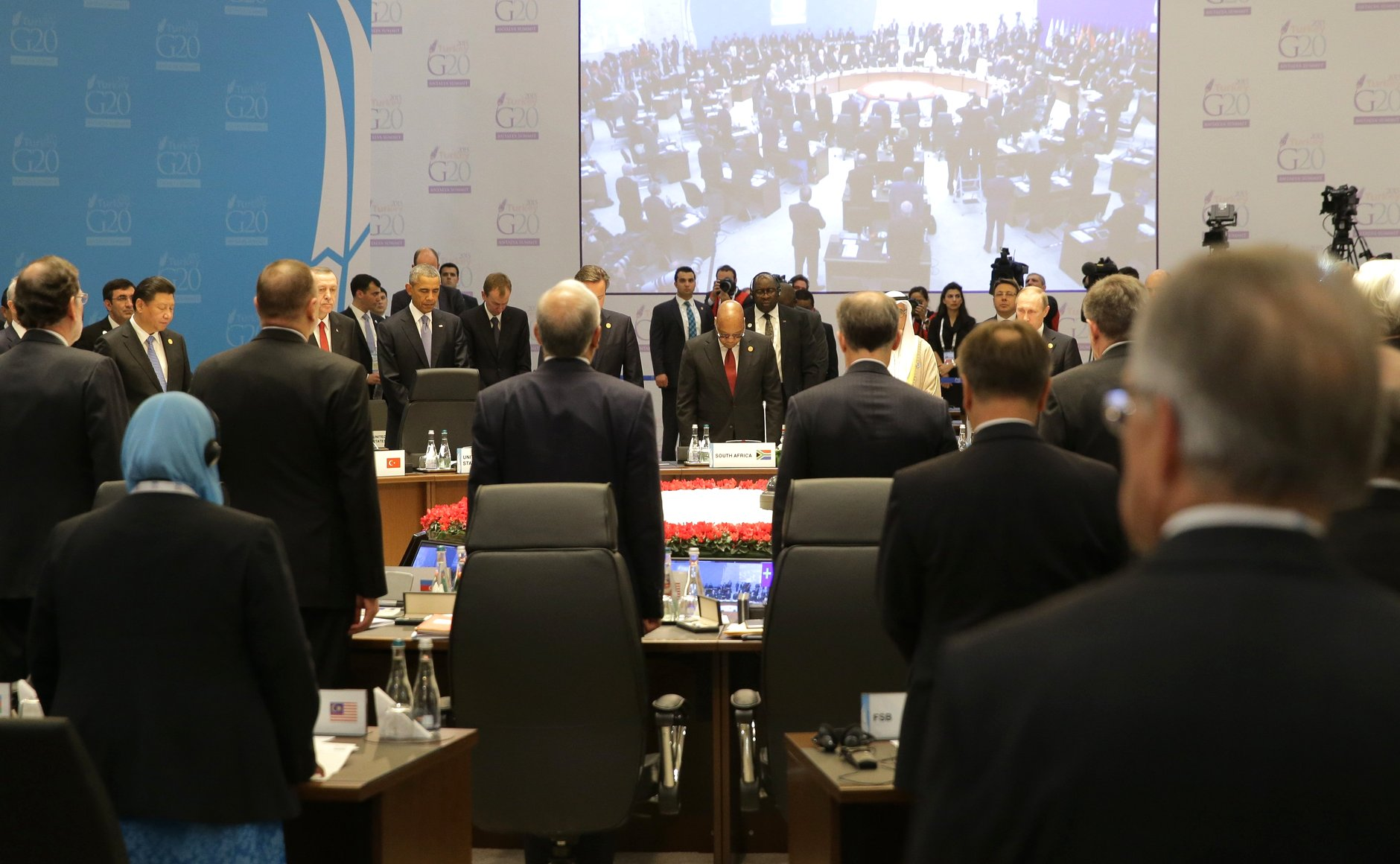
A minute of silence to honour the memory of the victims of the terrorist attacks in Paris before the 2015 G-20 Antalya summit

- Asia-Pacific Economic Cooperation: A declaration released by the 21 member states of the APEC said "Under the shadow cast by the terrorist attacks in Paris, Beirut, and against Russian aircraft over the Sinai, and elsewhere, we strongly condemn all acts, methods, and practices of terrorism in all their forms and manifestations."
- African Union: Chairperson Nkosazana Dlamini-Zuma condemned the "despicable" attacks, expressed her condolences to the people of France, and wished those injured in the attacks a speedy recovery.
- Association of Southeast Asian Nations: The ASEAN released a statement on behalf of its 10 states condemning the attacks and extending its condolences and sympathies to the French Government and the families of the victims of the attacks. The ASEAN pledged to continue the fight against terrorism, saying "ASEAN stands united with the Government of France and remains resolute in its continued fight against terrorism in all its forms and manifestations."
- Anglican Communion: Archbishop of Canterbury, Justin Welby described the news as a "desperate and deep tragedy" and wrote that "We weep with those affected and pray for deliverance and justice."
- The Arab League condemned the attacks stating "Such despicable terror attacks, with their dimensions, gravity and ugliness, target humanity everywhere."
- Caribbean Community: The leaders of CARICOM unanimously condemned the attacks.
- Commonwealth of Nations: Kamalesh Sharma, Commonwealth Secretary-General stated "My heart goes out to all those who have been touched by this unspeakable tragedy. The Commonwealth stands in solidarity with all democracies in the face of violent extremism. Everyone who believes in tolerance, understanding and the rule of law must stand united against those who would destroy these treasured values".
  - Commonwealth realms: Queen Elizabeth II sent a message to the President of France saying "Prince Philip and I have been deeply shocked and saddened by the terrible loss of life in Paris. We send our most sincere condolences to you, the families of those who have died and the French people."
- Economic Community of West African States: Speaker of the Parliament of ECOWAS, Ike Ekweremadu called the attacks "acts of brazen savagery" and said the attacks were not only a loss to France but a loss to humanity. He said that a majority of peace-loving people would never surrender to a few, saying "They will never bomb the world to submission" Ekweremadu offered condolences to France on behalf of the ECOWAS Parliament.
- Council of Europe: Secretary General Thorbjørn Jagland expressed his "shock at the horrific attacks" and pledged that "Europe will stand strong in defending our common values."
- European Union Commission Vice-President Federica Mogherini and EU defence ministers backed France's request for help in military missions after they invoked Article 42.7 of the Treaty of the European Union for the first time since its creation. Jean-Claude Juncker, President of the European Commission, rejected calls to rethink the European Union's policy on migration. Dismissing suggestions that open borders led to the attacks, Juncker said he believed that the attacks should be met with a stronger display of liberal values, including internal open borders. The Czech Prime Minister expressed disappointment over Juncker's response.
  - The attacks prompted European officials—particularly German officials—to re-evaluate their stance on EU policy toward migrants, especially in light of the ongoing European migrant crisis. UN agencies called on governments to provide reception centres for the registration and screening of the refugees, as well as accommodation to protect them, especially the children. Many German officials believed a higher level of scrutiny was needed, and criticised the position of German Chancellor Angela Merkel, while the German Vice-Chancellor Sigmar Gabriel defended her stance, saying that a lot of migrants were fleeing terrorism.
- Interpol: Secretary General Jürgen Stock condemned the "cold-blooded, cowardly" attacks and expressed condolences to those affected by them. Stock said that Interpol stands in solidarity with France and all victims of terrorism around the world. He pledged Interpol's support with any investigations made as a result of the attacks, saying "INTERPOL is united with France and has pledged its full operational support to its authorities as they investigate these barbaric attacks."
- NATO: Secretary General Jens Stoltenberg condemned the terrorist attack, expressing shock at the "horrific terrorist attacks across Paris," and stated that "terrorism will never defeat democracy." All flags at NATO HQ were flown at half-staff also after the attacks to show solidarity with France.
- Nordic Council: President of the Nordic Council Höskuldur Þórhallsson condemned the attacks, and quoted "Liberté, égalité, fraternité – liberty, equality, fraternity. Just as the national motto of France could also be the motto of the Nordic Region, so we see the attacks on the people of Paris as an attack on ourselves and on our values" and continued saying "Nevertheless, I think it's difficult to find words to express the horror of seeing innocent civilians lose their lives to senseless acts of terrorism".
- Organisation for Economic Co-operation and Development: Secretary-General José Ángel Gurría released a statement expressing his condolences to the people of France and a letter to the French president, saying "Our heartfelt condolences, thoughts and prayers are with the citizens of our host country France and our host city Paris and most particularly the families of the victims of these atrocities. This is a moment when we must all stand more united than ever in defence of the freedoms our democracies hold dear."
- Organisation internationale de la Francophonie: Secretary General Michaëlle Jean condemned the attacks, stating "I am deeply shocked and dismayed by the cowardly and odious attacks that cause suffering and trauma. I condemn in the strongest terms these immoral and senseless attacks intended to spread terror across the world. These unacceptable and unjustifiable attacks that occur in the aftermath of those perpetrated in Beirut remind us of the need to resist together to the scourge that is terrorism."
- The OIC, the Organisation of Islamic Cooperation, "condemned in the strictest terms the terrorist attacks", sending "sincere condolences to the families of the victims as well as to the Government and people of France" while stating a "firm rejection of any terrorist act that violates the right to life and try to undermine universal human values including the values of freedom and equality that France has consistently promoted."
- UNASUR: Secretary General Ernesto Samper said that "terrorism is a global epidemic that must be fought with universal solidarity with the victims." In a statement, the organization says that South America expressed its "dismay at this barbarism" that took place in Paris, and provides "solidarity" to the French people.
- United Nations: Secretary-General Ban Ki-moon condemned the attacks on Paris, calling them "despicable" and stating that he trusted the French authorities to bring the perpetrators to justice. Ban also extended his condolences to families of the victims and wished a quick recovery to those who were injured.
  - United Nations Security Council Resolution 2249: In a separate statement the 15 members of the UNSC also condemned the "barbaric and cowardly" attacks on the civilians.

== Government reactions ==
=== European Union ===
==== European Commission and Parliament ====
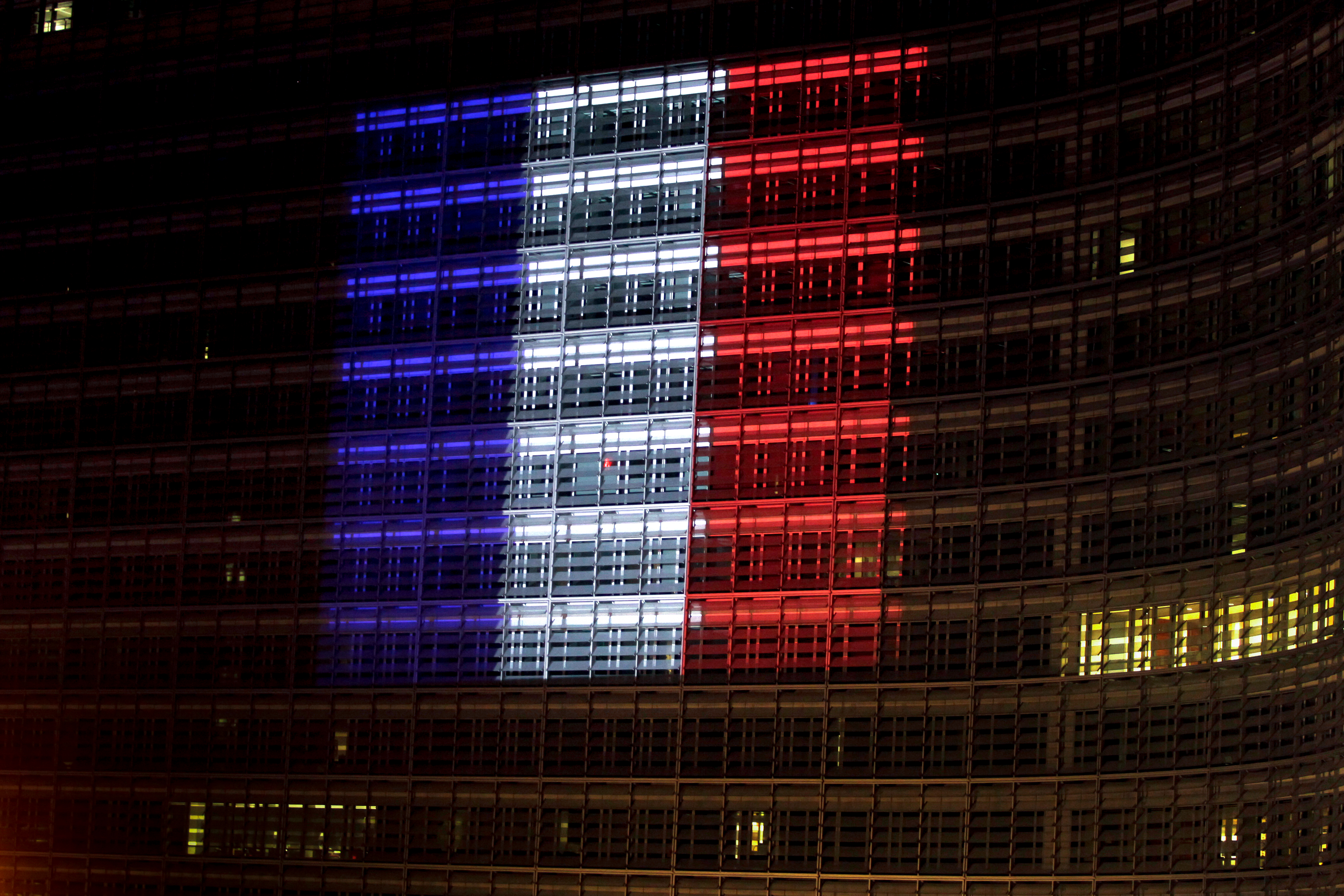
Berlaymont building of the European Commission lit up with the French flag to show solidarity

The attack interrupted final negotiations over the Budget of the European Union, with participants taking breaks to watch TV news of the events. Commission Vice-President Kristalina Georgieva said that the events encouraged shocked negotiators to end the talks quickly, with a final agreement five days before 18 November deadline. Commission Vice-President Federica Mogherini and EU defence ministers backed France's request for help in military missions after they invoked Article 42.7 of the Treaty of the European Union for the first time since its creation.

As a result, the United Kingdom has already stated its intention to help France directly in operations in Syria, while some countries intend to aid France by taking over activities in Africa, namely in Mali and the Central African Republic. Germany will send up to 650 troops to Mali and 50 military trainers to Kurdish forces in Iraq. Spain, Lithuania and Slovenia announced similar actions.

Jean-Claude Juncker, President of the European Commission, rejected calls to rethink the European Union's policy on migration. Dismissing suggestions that open borders led to the attacks, Juncker said he believed that the attacks should be met with a stronger display of liberal values, including internal open borders. The Czech Prime Minister expressed disappointment over Juncker's response.

==== European Council ====
The attacks prompted European officials—particularly German officials—to re-evaluate their stance on EU policy toward migrants, especially in light of the ongoing European migrant crisis. Many German officials believed a higher level of scrutiny was needed, and criticised the position of German Chancellor Angela Merkel, while the German Vice-Chancellor Sigmar Gabriel defended her stance, saying that a lot of migrants were fleeing terrorism.

French Interior Minister Bernard Cazeneuve said that he would be meeting with EU ministers on 20 November in Brussels to discuss how to deal with terrorism across the European Union. Meeting reports indicated that Schengen area border controls have been tightened for EU citizens entering or leaving, with passport checks and systematic screening against biometric databases. This is based on a temporary measure; changing the rules on a long-term basis could take months.

Poland's European affairs minister designate Konrad Szymański declared that, in the wake of the attacks, he saw no possibility of enacting the recent EU refugee relocation scheme. The new Prime Minister of Poland, Beata Szydło, while acknowledging that Poland is bound by international treaties, said she would ask the EU to change its decision on refugee quotas. Szydlo later stated that Poland would honour the commitment made by the previous government to accommodate 9,000 refugees.

Hungary's prime minister, Viktor Orbán, rejected the concept of mandatory resettlement quotas.

Andrej Babiš, Czech deputy prime minister, proposed closing the Schengen border. Czech Prime Minister, Bohuslav Sobotka, said the attacks were a wake-up call for Europe. Sobotka also criticized president Miloš Zeman for supporting anti-Islamic groups and spreading hatred, according to Reuters, whose report adds that the Sobotka government has been deporting migrants.

Slovakia's prime minister, Robert Fico, said he was proven right about the links between Middle East migrants and security.

=== Canada ===
Canada maintained its commitment to accept 25,000 Syrian refugees, and in early November, set a challenging deadline, the end of 2015. By 24 November however, it was clear that no more than 10,000 could be accommodated by year end; the rest would arrive by March 2016. Prime Minister Justin Trudeau said that the accompanying security measures would protect Canadians. By 20 November, financial plans were being made for the proposed funding for six years, estimated at $1.1 billion. Discussions as to how and where refugees would be resettled were also under way. However, an expert, Gerard Van Kessel, retired director-general of the refugees branch at Citizenship and Immigration Canada, warned on 23 November 2015 that a five or six weeks is not adequate to complete security checks and resettle 25,000 people.

All of the provinces had agreed to accept refugees and all but one provided specifics as to the number they would be able to support. On 22 November 2015, the Canadian Broadcasting Corporation reported that (according to unnamed sources) Canada will limit the acceptance of Syrian refugees to only women, children and families, screening out unaccompanied men. Public Safety Minister Ralph Goodale assured Canadians that a robust screening process would be used overall, but admitted that some checks would be done once the refugees were already in Canada. However, a criminologist, Barry Cartwright of Simon Fraser University is convinced that it's impossible to do thorough security checks "in a region where there are basically no recognized police departments."

=== United States ===
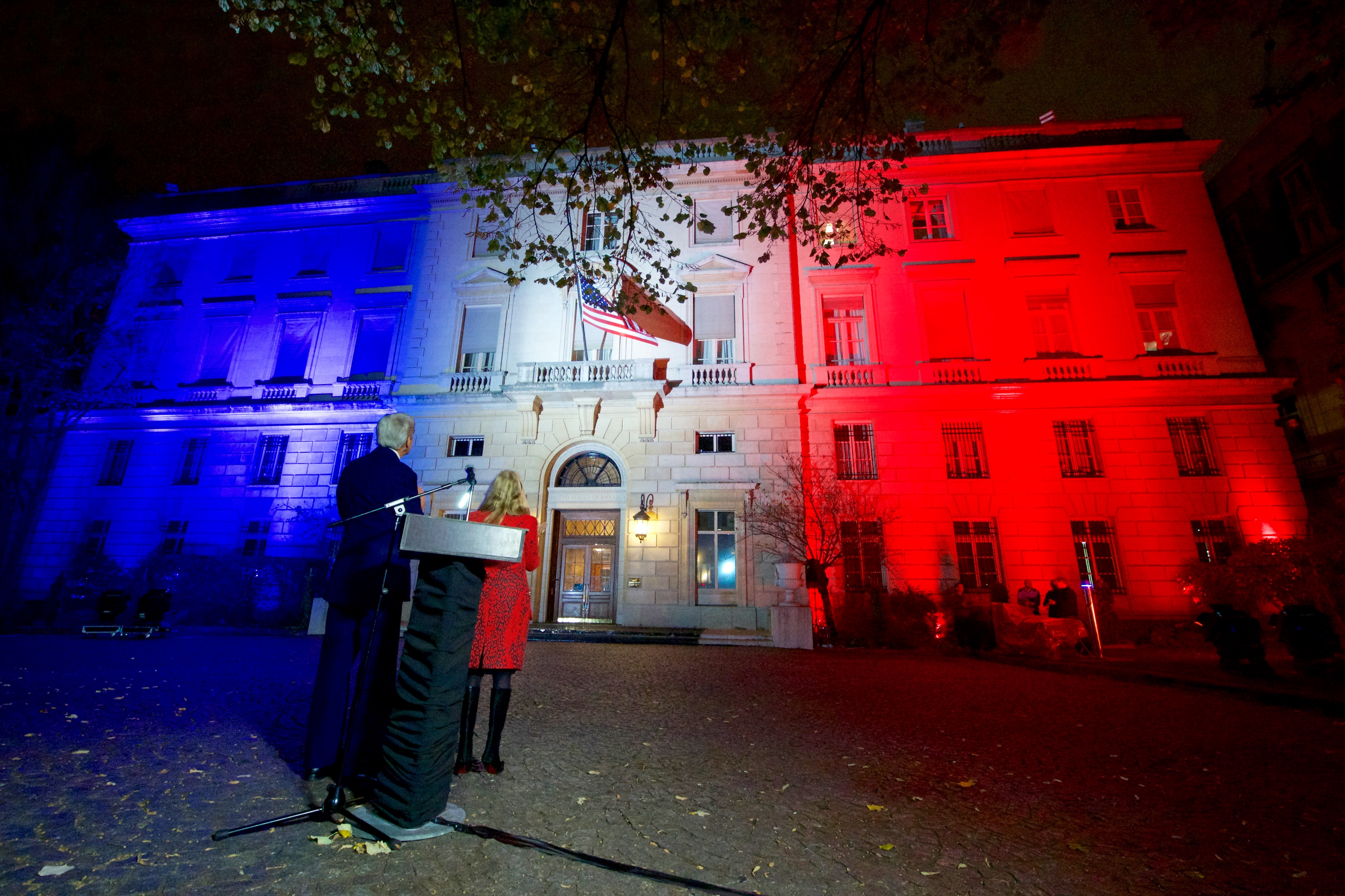
U.S. Embassy, Paris was illuminated in French flag to show solidarity after the attacks.

The US House of Representatives passed the American SAFE Act of 2015, which makes it more difficult for Syrian and Iraqi refugees to enter the United States. The bill failed to pass the Senate. At least 31 state governors said that they opposed accepting Syrian refugees into their states, although the decision to accept refugees belongs to the federal government; numerous mayors of major US cities have said they would welcome more refugees.

The United Nations asked Congress and governors to continue accepting Syrian refugees who had been vetted by security measures as an example to other countries.

=== Other nations' responses ===
Many world leaders and governments expressed their condemnation of the attacks and their condolences to the victims. These included:

==== Africa ====
- Algeria: President Abdelaziz Bouteflika said "Algeria strongly condemns these terrorist crimes, which attest, unfortunately once more, to the fact that terrorism is a cross-border scourge."
- Angola: Head of State José Eduardo dos Santos expressed sorrow and solidarity with the French people.
- Benin: The Government of Benin said in a statement "The Beninese government and people are affected and deeply shocked by the horrible terrorist attack that hit France." A day of mourning was held on 16 November in which flags around the country were flown at half-mast and a minute of silence was held in remembrance of the victims of terrorist attacks in Paris, West Africa and the rest of the world.
- Democratic Republic of the Congo: President Joseph Kabila expressed shock at the attacks and offered his condolences. He affirmed the Congolese people's solidarity towards the French in the fight against terrorism.
- Egypt: President Abdel Fattah el-Sisi telephoned Hollande and offered condolences on behalf of the Egyptian people to the French government and people for the victims of the despicable terrorist attack. He affirmed Egypt's solidarity with France and condemnation of terrorism in all its forms. El-Sisi also insisted that these terrorist acts occurring in different parts of the world will not deter these nations and peoples from fighting terrorism and extremism and their destructive and extreme ideologies. The Great Pyramid of Giza was lit up with the flags of France, Lebanon and Russia.
- Ethiopia: Prime Minister Hailemariam Desalegn condemned the attacks, and Foreign Minister Tedros Adhanom offered condolences saying "Our sympathies and condolences to the families of the victims of the terror attack in Paris. Our solidarity is with the people and government of France."
- Ghana: President John Mahama condemning the "despicable" attacks and expressing condolences towards the families of the victims who were killed. He wished the survivors a speedy recovery.
- Kenya: President Uhuru Kenyatta, in a statement issued hours after the attack, condemned the murder of innocent civilians in cold blood, stating that Kenya has suffered similar attacks. This was in reference to the Garissa University College attack earlier in 2015, and the Westgate shopping mall attack, which were primarily targeted at civilians. He added that Kenya was ready to offer every assistance possible, and that he would continue to relentlessly push the country's war against terrorist groups such as Al-Shabaab and their support networks.
- Madagascar: President Hery Rajaonarimampianina released a statement expressing his sympathy following the attacks. The Madagascan foreign minister sent a message of condolence to the French foreign minister.
- Mauritius: Prime Minister Sir Anerood Jugnauth said that Mauritius "unreservedly condemns terrorism, in all its forms and remains committed to extend full support to the international community to combat terror." He expressed his condolences in a letter to President Hollande on behalf of himself and the people of Mauritius.
- Morocco: King Mohammed VI offered "most saddened" condolences to the French President, the families of the victims and to French citizens, wishing a speedy recovery for the wounded. He condemned "in the strongest terms, on behalf of the Moroccan people and in my own name, these vile terrorist acts," and expressed "full solidarity and support in this ordeal."
- Namibia: President Hage Geingob writes in a short message of condolence to the French government: "They have strengthened our resolve to ensure that the ideals of liberté, égalité, fraternité ring true as we persevere in our common fight against hate and intolerance." Namibia's secretary of international affairs, Selma Ashipala-Musavyi, said: "As a member of the community of nations, we are shocked and dismayed by what has happened. We condemn the attacks and stand together with the French people and their government."
- Nigeria: President Muhammadu Buhari released a statement expressing his shock at learning of the attacks and offering his condolences to the people and government of France. Buhari condemned terrorism and called on the international to work together against it.
- Rwanda: Foreign Affairs minister Louise Mushikiwabo said that Rwandans express sympathy to those affected by the Paris attacks and that "These are times for international solidarity indeed!"
- Seychelles: Minister of Tourism and Culture Alain St. Ange signed a book of condolences at the French embassy in the Seychelles and called for increased security, saying "Today it is safety and security that have become unique selling points for tourism destinations, and the Community of Nations must continue to work together to make the world a safer place."
- Somalia: President Hassan Sheikh Mohamud sent his sincere condolences to the families of those affected in the attacks, and strongly condemned the acts of terror. In a statement, President Mohamud said that "the world must stand united against those who wreak savagery in the name of enlightenment and their acts are a travesty against Islam and humanity." He reiterated that Somalia stands ready to support the Government of France in this hour of darkness.
- South Africa: President Jacob Zuma sent his condolences to the people and the government of France in a message sent to President Hollande following the attacks. The Department of International Relations and Cooperation confirmed that it was in contact with its embassy in France to ensure the safety of South African citizens in France.
- Sudan: Sudanese Foreign Ministry spokesman Ali Al-Sadiq issued a statement condemning the attacks, saying that such acts are "against all religious and human values."
- Togo: President Faure Gnassingbé condemned the attacks. In a letter to Francois Hollande, he writes "In these tragic and extremely painful hours for France, I wish to express my emotion, my compassion and solidarity of the entire people of Togo who is in shock and deeply scarred by the heavy toll of these unprecedented attacks."
- Tunisia: President Beji Caid Essebsi condemned the attacks, calling them "barbarous acts." He also met with President Hollande on 15 November.
- Zambia: Foreign Affairs Minister Harry Kalaba condemned the attacks, saying they were a drawback on humanity. He also signed a book of condolences at the French embassy in Zambia.
- Zimbabwe: President Robert Mugabe expressed his condolences at the G20 summit in Turkey. Minister of State Security Kembo Mohadi said that Zimbabwe was obliged to fight terrorism and that members of the Southern African Development Community were sharing intelligence in order to combat terrorism. He also said that Zimbabwean and Zambian security officials met to discuss terrorism among other topics.

==== Americas ====
- Argentina: President Cristina Fernández de Kirchner condemned the attacks.
- Bahamas Prime Minister Perry Christie issued a statement saying "We condemn these barbaric acts in the strongest terms. We extend our condolences to the families of the victims."
- Bolivia: President Evo Morales voiced solidarity with France.

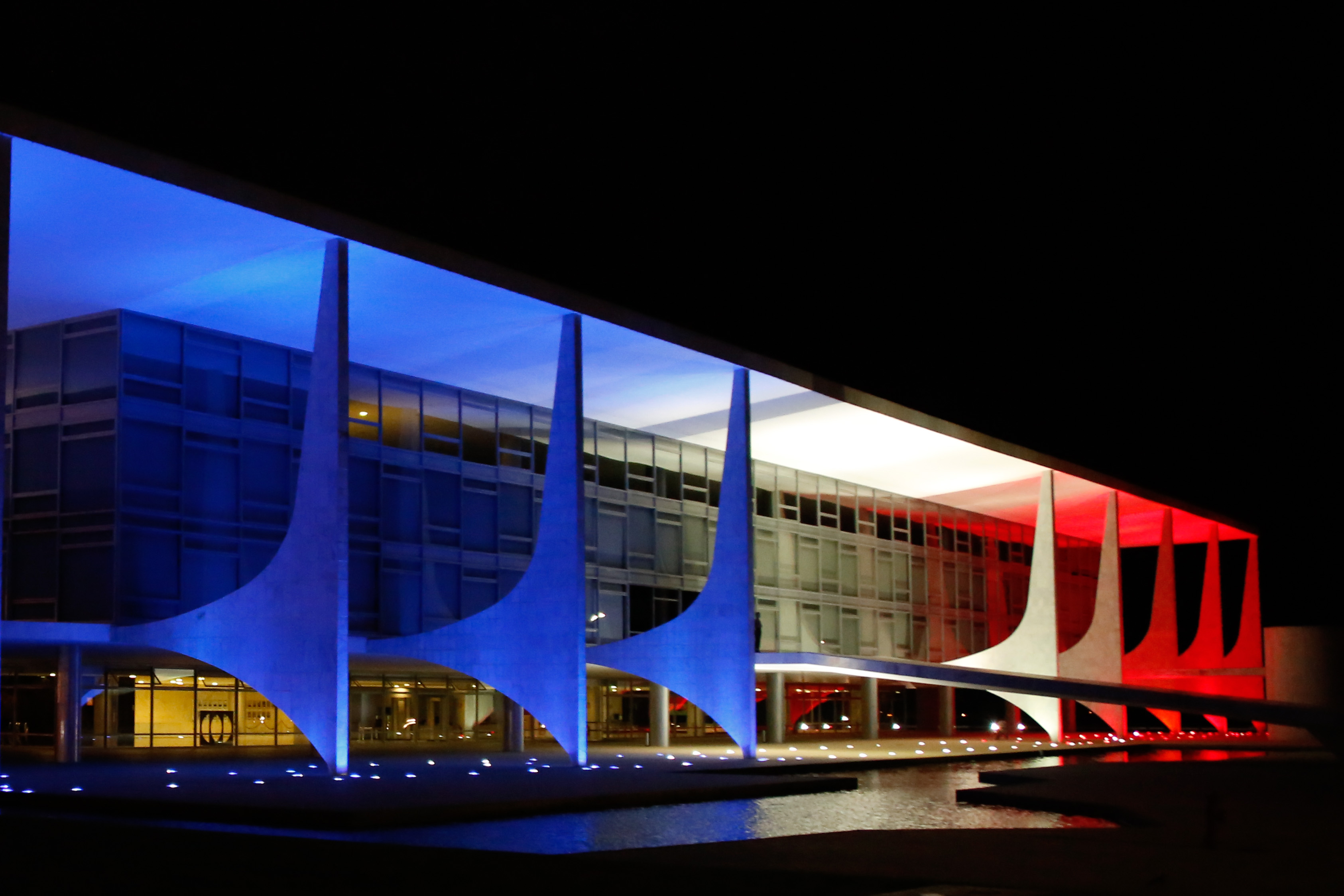
Palácio do Planalto in Brasília light up in French tricolours to express solidarity

- Brazil: President Dilma Rousseff said that she was "appalled by the terrorist barbarity," repudiating the attacks. The Ministry of External Relations of Brazil, in a statement, expressed "deep sorrow" on the part of the Brazilian government through conveying condolences to the relatives of victims and declaring solidarity with the French people and the Government of France. Brazilian citizens who are in France are also getting support from the Brazilian Consulate in Paris through a phone line.
- Canada: Governor General of Canada David Johnston issued a statement reading "Canada grieves for Paris and all of France... [W]e will stand together for the values we hold dear with resolve and steadfast solidarity", going on to express his and his wife's "outrage" and "condolences to those who have been victimized by these heinous acts." Prime Minister Justin Trudeau expressed solidarity with Canada's "French cousins" and said Canada offered all possible assistance to the government and people of France in wake of the attacks. "[W]e'll continue to engage with our allies around the world in ensuring the safety of Canadians and others both here at home and around the world."
- Chile: President Michelle Bachelet condemned the attacks, calling them "cowardly acts of terror".
- Colombia: President Juan Manuel Santos said "We condemn attacks in Paris. Our solidarity goes to the french people and President François Hollande. Coincidentally I talked to him today."
- Cuba: First Secretary of the Communist Party Raúl Castro wrote to President Hollande to express his condolences on behalf of the people and government of Cuba.
- Ecuador: President Rafael Correa called for solidarity after the attacks.
- Guatemala: President Alejandro Maldonado, Vice President Alfonso Fuentes, Jimmy Morales and Jafeth Cabrera all condemned the attacks.
- Guyana: The Government of Guyana said "Guyana condemns, in the strongest possible terms, these coordinated despicable acts of pure evil perpetrated on innocent citizens which resulted in the needless loss of life. Guyana sends condolences and prayerful thoughts to our friends in France and all French citizens throughout the world."
- Haiti: President Michel Martelly condemned the attacks in an official statement, saying "The Head of State strongly condemns these atrocities of terrorist nature that harm not only the French people but also the humanity as a whole that needs more than ever to close ranks to defend the right to freedom, tolerance and life." He also gave his condolences to France, saying "On behalf of the Government and people of Haiti, the President of the Republic sends his sympathies to President François Hollande, the French people and to the relatives of the victims in these difficult times. Haiti remains in solidarity with France and reaffirms its support on the occasion of this drama."
- Jamaica: Prime Minister Portia Simpson Miller Jamaica joined "all peace-loving peoples" to condemn the attacks as "heartless and barbaric" and pledged to stand "in defence of the universal values of life, liberty and peace for which Jamaica stands as a nation. We pledge our solidarity and support in concert with the global peace-loving community to root out and destroy the acts of evil that those who hate our way of life and values would unleash upon us".
- Mexico: President Enrique Peña Nieto condemned the attacks and sent condolences to the French people and the victims' families. He stated that the Secretariat of Foreign Affairs was working with French officials to assist any Mexican nationals in need of assistance in Paris. While heading to Turkey for the G-20 Summit, Peña Nieto was interviewed at the airport and reiterated his solidarity with France. He stated that the incident was likely going to be discussed at the Antalya summit.
- Panama: President Juan Carlos Varela condemned the attacks and ordered increased security at the Panama Canal.
- Paraguay: President Horacio Cartes condemned the terrorist acts, calling them "despicable terror attacks".
- Peru: President Ollanta Humala strongly condemned the attacks and encouraged solidarity.
- Saint Lucia: Saint Lucian politician Gale Rigobert, speaking on behalf of Saint Lucia, condemned the attacks and made a call "to stand in solidarity with France and join in praying for the people of that country."
- United States: President Barack Obama stated that the attacks were not just attacks on Paris and people of France, but were "an attack on all of humanity and the universal values that we share." As of 18 November, thirty states declared they will refuse to accept Syrian refugees, as they believe it to be too dangerous following the Paris attacks.
- Uruguay: The Government of Uruguay condemned the attacks and called for a renewed fight against terror.
- Venezuela: President Nicolás Maduro condemned the terrorist acts in Paris and expressed solidarity with Hollande and the French people.

==== Asia ====
- Afghanistan: President Mohammad Ashraf Ghani said "The brutal attacks in Paris prove that global terrorism does not recognize borders. The people of Afghanistan stand with France on this terrible day. Terrorism is a serious threat to the entire world and we are united in the struggle."
- Bahrain: The Kingdom of Bahrain strongly condemned the attacks and offered condolences and consolation to the government of France and to the French people.
- Bangladesh: Prime Minister Sheikh Hasina stated "I am deeply shocked by the series of terrorist attacks in Paris that killed so many innocent people and left many others injured. I along with the people and the government of Bangladesh strongly condemn these acts of terror and stand in solidarity with the people and the government of France." In addition, President Abdul Hamid strongly condemned the attacks and prayed for the souls of the slain victims and expressed his condolences to the bereaved family members.
- Brunei: Sultan Hassanal Bolkiah, in his condolence letter to the French President, condemned the attacks.
- Cambodia: In a letter addressed to Hollande, Prime Minister Hun Sen of the ruling Cambodian People's Party expressed "shock and consternation", while the opposition Cambodian National Rescue Party also issued a statement condemning the "cruel attacks". A Cambodian restaurant Le Petit Cambodge was among the sites of the attacks.
- China: Premier Li Keqiang strongly condemned the Paris terror attacks and delivered condolences and sympathy to the victims. General Secretary of the Communist Party Xi Jinping, in a message to President Hollande, wrote "on behalf of the Chinese government and the Chinese people, and personally, condemn in the strongest terms the barbaric acts." Foreign Minister Wang Yi told his French counterpart, Laurent Fabius that China is willing to cooperate with France against terrorism which he describes as "the cancer of society." Wang said that China was "shocked" and condemns the attacks. He also added that China mourns for those killed in the attacks, expresses condolences to the families of people who were killed and injured due to the attacks.
  - Hong Kong: Chief Executive Leung Chun-ying condemned the attacks and expressed deep sympathies. The Hong Kong government issued an amber travel alert for France, and urged residents to avoid nonessential travel to France, in particular to the Île-de-France area.
- East Timor: Prime Minister Rui Maria de Araújo said "Our hearts go out to the people of France, to all those sadly impacted by these traumatic events. They remain in our thoughts and prayers at this difficult time". Timor-Leste joins the global community in condemning the terrorist acts and stands in solidarity with the people of France.
- India: Prime Minister Narendra Modi stated "News from Paris is anguishing and dreadful. Prayers with families of the deceased. We are united with people of France in this tragic hour." while head of state President Pranab Mukherjee strongly condemned the attacks and stated that "India stands firmly by France, my heart goes out to its people."
- Indonesia: President Joko Widodo expressed condolences on the attack. He said that "Terrorism, regardless of form and reason, cannot be tolerated." He also asked the international community to join the fight against terrorism.
- Iran: Foreign Minister Mohammad Javad Zarif expressed condolence to France and its people following the attacks and said that he condemns "terrorist operations at any forms" saying that Iran as a victim of terrorist attacks has been against all forms activities related to terrorism. He also added that Iran believes that terrorism and extremism is a threat not just limited in the Middle East region and urged anti-terrorism efforts not to be restricted to the region. President Hassan Rouhani has also postponed his visit to Italy and France due to the attacks and also strongly condemned the incident describing the attacks as crimes against humanity and expressed condolence to the French people and government.
- Iraq: Prime Minister Haider al-Abadi said "We condemn and deplore the terrorist attacks in Paris, which emphasise that fighting terrorism calls for international efforts to eliminate it in all countries".
  - Iraqi Kurdistan: Prime Minister Nechirvan Barzani stated, "It is with great sadness that I learned of the horrific attacks on the people of Paris. I offer the deepest condolences, and the strongest solidarity, of the people of the Kurdistan Region. France has stood resolutely with the Kurdistan Region in our own struggle against terrorism, and we will stand with them in theirs. The challenge of defeating this threat unites so many nations and peoples around the world. It is a struggle between civilization and intolerance and barbarism. Attacks like this are designed to spread fear, but the international community must instead respond with a strengthened resolve. Indeed, this tragedy came one day after a great defeat for Daesh in Sinjar. Terrorism can, and will, be defeated."
- Israel: Prime Minister Benjamin Netanyahu expressed condolences in the terror attack that happened. He also ordered that the Israeli flag should be in half-mast. He said: "Israel stands shoulder to shoulder with President Francois Hollande and with the French people in the war against terrorism. I send condolences on behalf of the Israeli people to the families of the victims, and wish a speedy recovery to the injured." He also ordered security forces to tighten security.

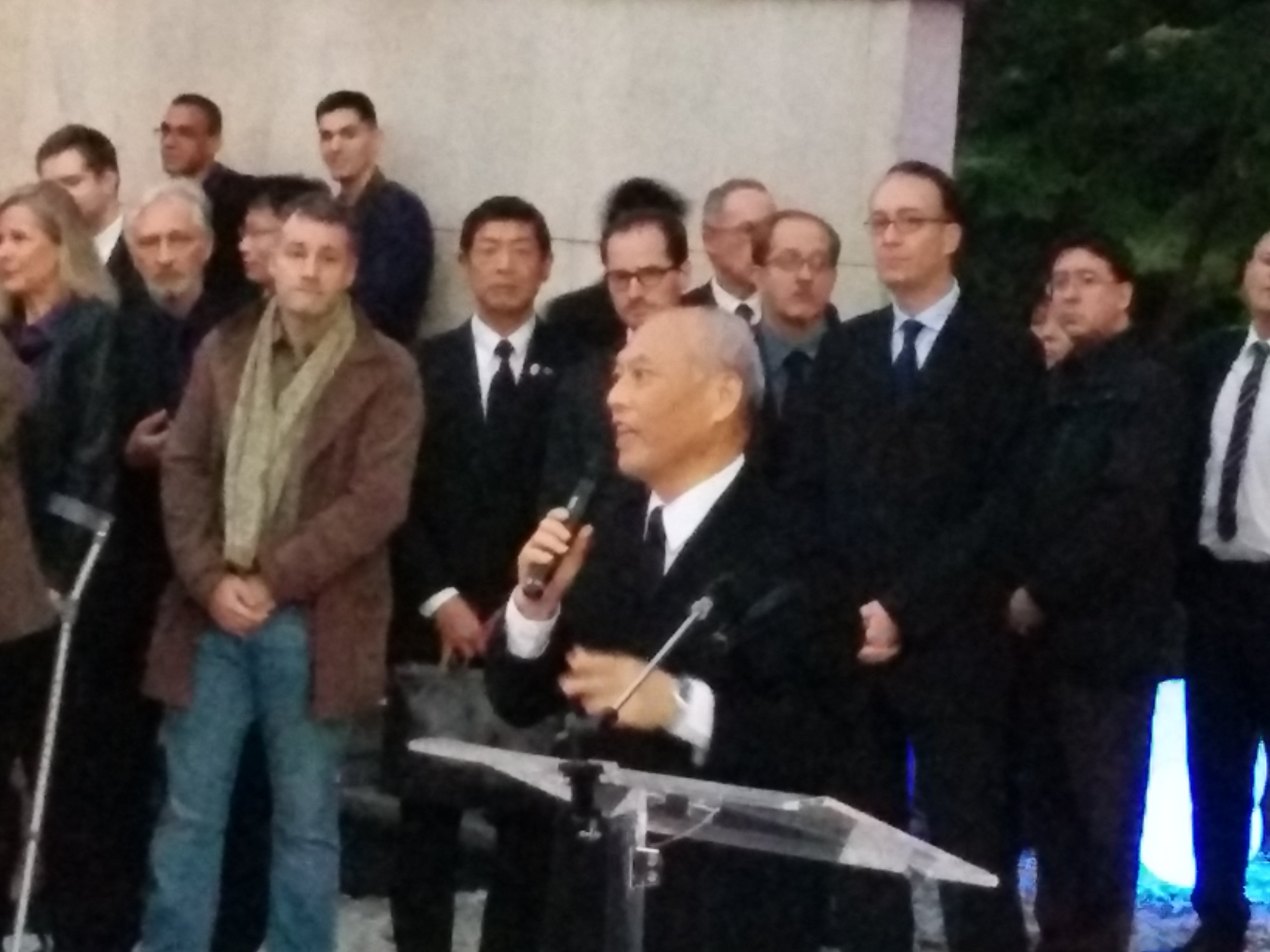
Governor of Tokyo Yōichi Masuzoe offers his sympathy at the French embassy in Tokyo, 15 November.

- Japan: Chief Cabinet Secretary Yoshihide Suga condemned the attacks, telling reporters that he felt "strong shock and outrage" to the attacks which he describes as "cruel and extremely cowardly acts of terrorism." Foreign Minister Fumio Kishida said that Japan intends to cooperate with France in an ongoing "international fight" against terrorism. He also added that Japan stands with France. Security was boosted in locations related to French interests in Tokyo and other places in Japan such as the French Embassy in Tokyo. Prime Minister Shinzō Abe who was in Turkey ahead of a G-20 summit, observed a moment of silence together with his Turkish counterpart, Ahmet Davutoglu, in honor of those killed in the Paris attacks. He said "We will stand against terrorism regardless of its reasons. We will stand in solidarity with the international community to prevent acts of terrorism."
- Jordan: King Abdullah II condemned the attacks, stating that he "expressed strong condemnation and indignation at the cowardly terrorist act."
- Kazakhstan: President Nursultan Nazarbayev said, "Kazakhstan condemns terrorism and extremism in all forms as threats to the international security."
- Kuwait: Emir Sabah Al-Ahmad Al-Jaber Al-Sabah condemned the terrorist attacks, stating "these criminal acts of terrorism ... run counter to all teachings of holy faith and humanitarian values."
- Kyrgyzstan: President Almazbek Atambayev condemned the attacks and offered condolences, saying "Kyrgyzstan condemns terrorism in its all forms and supports efforts of the international community in fighting that threat".
- Laos: A statement issued by the Laotian Government said "We strongly condemn such acts by terrorists. The Lao PDR will continue to cooperate with the international community in the fight against all forms of terrorism".
- Lebanon: The Secretary-General of Hezbollah, Hassan Nasrallah, strongly condemned the attacks as "barbaric" and expressed his solidarity with the French people. Statements of condemnation were also issued by militant groups such as Hamas and the Islamic Jihad Movement in Palestine. A joint statement was also issued by rebel groups fighting in Syria, such as Jaysh al-Islam, condemning the attack "in the strongest terms."
- Malaysia: Prime Minister Najib Razak expressed his shock about the attack, and condemns the "outrageous attacks in Paris on innocent civilians".
- Mongolia: Minister for Foreign Affairs Purevsuren Lundeg sent a letter of condolences and "strongly condemned the attack on universal values".
- Nepal: Prime Minister K. P. Sharma Oli condemned the attack and offered condolences to the French President.
- North Korea: Foreign Minister Ri Su-yong sent a message of sympathy to his French counterpart Laurent Fabius. The message expressed hope "that the French people would eradicate the aftermath of the heart-rending tragedy and bring back peace and stability at an early date."
- Oman: Sultan Qaboos bin Said condemned the attacks and offered his condolences to the French people. Under Secretary General of Ministry of Foreign Affairs Sayyid Badr bin Hamad bin Hamood Al Busaidi stated "The sad events in Paris are utterly deplorable. Our sympathy goes to the victims."
- Pakistan: The Foreign Office of Pakistan condemned the attacks and issued the following statement: "The people and government of Pakistan strongly condemn the deadly terrorist attacks in Paris. We stand with them in their hour of grief. We pray for speedy recovery of the injured." Both the Prime Minister Nawaz Sharif and President Mamnoon Hussain condemned the attacks and express solidarity with France. The National Assembly of Pakistan observed one minute silence over the incident.
- Palestine: President Mahmoud Abbas condemned the terrorist attacks and extended his sympathy and solidarity with the French people and government.
- Philippines: Deputy Presidential Spokesperson Abigail Valte issued a statement condemning the attacks that "showed not only premeditation but the cruelty that demands the greatest indignation from the world" and said that the Philippines mourns and stands shoulder to shoulder with France. Valte also urged Filipinos in Paris to cooperate with local authorities and said that the Department of Foreign Affairs through its embassy in Paris has been monitoring the situation. President Benigno Aquino III echoed Valte's statements expressing solidarity mentioning that France has stood shoulder to shoulder with the Philippines following the aftermath of Typhoon Yolanda (Haiyan). Foreign Undersecretary Laura del Rosario said to Agence France-Presse reporters on 14 November, that the attacks on Paris has prompted the organizers to impose "higher security" measures for the 2015 APEC Economic Leaders' Meeting to be held from 18 to 19 November 2015 in Manila.
- Qatar: Foreign Affairs Minister Khalid bin Mohammad Al Attiyah said that Qatar "strongly condemns these heinous attacks that have struck the French capital causing so many victims".
- Saudi Arabia: The Saudi Government condemned the attacks, with the Saudi Press Agency releasing a statement from the Council of Senior Scholars saying "Terrorists are not sanctioned by Islam and these acts are contrary to values of mercy it brought to the world."
- Singapore: President Tony Tan expressed his condolences saying "As France mourns the victims, Singapore stands in solidarity with the French people in this difficult time" while Prime Minister Lee Hsien Loong condemned the attacks, calling them "heinous" and "an attack on our shared humanity." Within days, the Singapore Police Force and Singapore Civil Defence conducted an emergency preparedness exercise codenamed 'Exercise Heartbeat' that took place on 18 November 2015 at Toa Payoh, Marina Bay and City Hall, as well as at Sentosa on 23 November 2015.
- South Korea: President Park Geun-hye offered her condolences over the attacks and pledged support for global counter-terrorism efforts, stating that "terrorism is a crime against humanity. It is never justified and should not be tolerated in any circumstance." She then states that South Korea will strongly support French efforts to root out terrorism and vowed to join international anti-terrorism efforts.
- Sri Lanka: President Maithripala Sirisena and Prime Minister Ranil Wickramasinghe condemned the terrorist attack and conveyed the condolences to the people of France, calling on the International community to fight against terrorism.
- Syria: President Bashar al-Assad condemned the attackers while describing them as "savage terror", and compared the violence to the experiences of the Syrian people, saying, "What France suffered from savage terror is what the Syrian people have been enduring for over five years." Al-Assad, who is also fighting ISIS in Syria criticised the assistance provided by Western nations to rebels fighting his government. He stated that policies pursued in the region by France and other Western nations had ultimately aided the spread of terrorism.
- Tajikistan: President Emomali Rakhmon condemned the attacks and gave condolences to the French people, stating "Tajikistan condemns categorically this inhuman act of a group of criminals," and "We are mourning together with you."
- Thailand: Prime Minister Prayut Chan-o-cha gave his condolences to those affected by the attacks, saying "On behalf of the Royal Thai Government and people of the Kingdom of Thailand, I wish to convey our deepest condolences and sympathies to the victims and families that have been affected by this tragic incident".
- United Arab Emirates: President Khalifa bin Zayed Al Nahyan offered his condolences and support to France.
- Vietnam: President Truong Tan Sang and Prime Minister Nguyen Tan Dung sent messages of condolences to their French counterparts over the heavy casualties caused by bloody attacks on civilians in Paris on 13 November.

==== Europe ====
- Albania: President Bujar Nishani and Prime Minister Edi Rama expressed their condolences.
- Andorra: In a letter to the President of France, who also serves as Co-Prince of Andorra, the Prime Minister and Receiver General strongly condemned the attacks and expressed their solidarity with the French people. Flags were flown at half-mast.
- Armenia: President Serzh Sargsyan said "Armenia is next to brother France in such a hard moment and is willing to make all support".

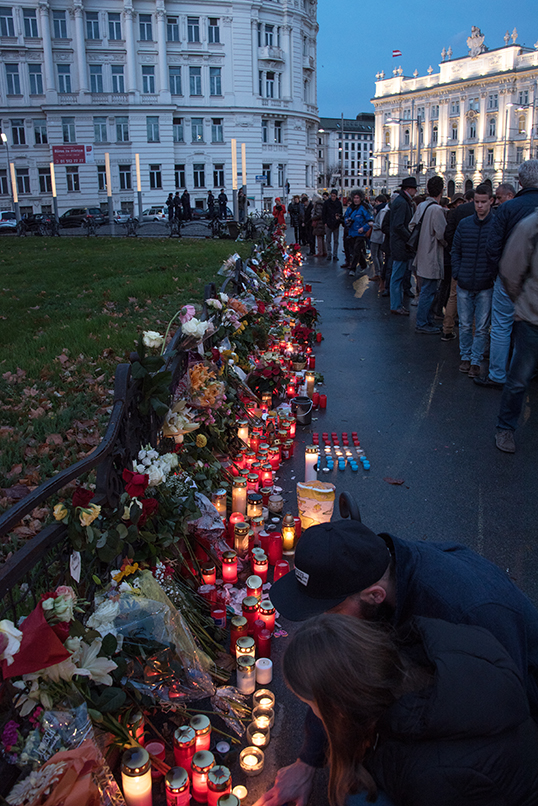
French Embassy in Vienna, Austria, 15 November 2015

- Austria: President Heinz Fischer condemned the attacks and offered his condolences, saying "I am deeply shocked and appalled by the series of attacks in Paris. I express the French people and especially the families of the victims my deepest condolences. These are moments when we stick together firmly and must demonstrate unity against inhumanity."
- Azerbaijan: President Ilham Aliyev condemned the attacks, stating "We are extremely angered by this horrible incident, resolutely condemn terror and comprehensively support fight against all its manifestations. In this difficult time our thoughts are with the people of France, with you."
- Belarus: President of Belarus Alexander Lukashenko said "With great pain in Belarus accepted the news of numerous casualties as a result of the terrorist attacks that took place in Paris on the night from 13 to 14 November 2015. On behalf of the Belarusian people and on my own behalf, I express my deepest condolences and words of support to the families and friends of those killed and injured, as well as all French people."
- Belgium: King Philippe expressed the solidarity of Belgium with the French people and the families of the victims of these "heinous acts." Warning of the threat of an imminent Paris-style terror attack in Belgium, authorities in Belgium on 21 November 2015 imposed a security lockdown by shutting down the Brussels Metro, canceling football games, and advising citizens to avoid public spaces.
- Bosnia and Herzegovina: The Presidency of Bosnia and Herzegovina issued a statement condemning the attacks and stating that "this vile, cowardly and mindless attack isn't just an attack on Paris and France, but an attack on all of humanity and the concept of democracy." They also added that stopping these attacks can only be done by being united and working together.
- Bulgaria: In a condolence letter addressed to Francois Hollande, President Rosen Plevneliev strongly condemned the attacks against innocent people. Prime Minister Boyko Borissov declared "full support and sympathy" with the families of the victims and French authorities. At the same time Bulgaria declared that it withdraws from EU refugee relocation plan
- Croatia: President Kolinda Grabar-Kitarović said she was "shocked" by the attacks and "deeply saddened by the loss of so many lives." She added that the people of Croatia stand with the people of France. Prime Minister Zoran Milanović called a news conference on 14 November and stated that Croatian security forces and agencies were on high alert. He also stated that he does not link the attacks to the European migrant crisis, with Croatia being the main transit country for entry into the Schengen Area. Croatian government also proclaimed 16 November 2015 to be the mourning day in solidarity with victims of the attack.
- Cyprus: President Nicos Anastasiades condemned the attacks, stating "Such cowardly acts are causing the outrage of the international community and every citizen".
- Czech Republic: Prime Minister Bohuslav Sobotka sent condolences to his French counterpart Manuel Valls saying "he was shocked by the brutality of the terrorist attacks carried in Paris and it has filled his heart with deep sorrow." He expressed solidarity and sympathies of the Czech Republic and offered France all the necessary cooperation. Foreign Minister Lubomír Zaorálek expressed support to the French president. He noted that such violence must be punished and we must not give up our lives and civilization we have built. President Miloš Zeman and Prime Minister Sobotka visited the French embassy in Prague, where they laid flowers and paid tribute. The Czech Deputy Prime Minister Andrej Babiš stated that "it will be necessary to close the Schengen border." Prime Minister Sobotka said the attacks were a wake-up call for Europe: "I saw the images from Paris and I do not want something similar happening in Prague." However, Sobotka also criticized president Miloš Zeman for supporting anti-Islamic groups and spreading hatred, according to Reuters, whose report also adds that the government "under Sobotka" has been deporting migrants.
- Denmark: Prime Minister Lars Løkke Rasmussen condemned the terrorist attacks and offered solidarity with France. "The extent of the attacks in Paris is incomprehensible and fills me with deep sorrow. It is a dark day in Europe," he said.
  - Greenland: The Government of Greenland also expressed its sympathy.
- Estonia: Foreign Minister Marina Kaljurand condemned the attack and gave her condolences to France, stating "We stand together with France, in the name of our common values. Estonia expresses solidarity with the French government in the fight against terrorism".
- Finland: Prime Minister Juha Sipilä expressed his shock and stated his thoughts are with Paris. President Sauli Niinistö strongly condemned the terrorist attacks. He said that Finland will give all possible support to France in the fight against terrorism.
- Georgia: President Giorgi Margvelashvili expressed his condolences, and stated "All of Georgia was moved by the brutal terrorist acts in France that killed many people. This is a crime against all of humanity. The people of Georgia and I stand by you and express our firm solidarity to you in your efforts against terrorism. Please convey my sympathies to the families of those who were killed and I wish a speedy recovery to all those who were injured."
- Germany: Chancellor Angela Merkel offered her condolences to the French people, saying: "We, your German friends, we feel so close to you. We are crying with you." President Joachim Gauck said during a speech at Schloss Bellevue that "The grief does not stop at the Rhine. […] But the terrorists will not have the last word. That night will not have the last word." In a speech on 25 November, the Chancellor agreed that a high level of security was necessary in Germany but encouraged citizens to live normal lives. She also defended her refugee policy, stating that the country had a duty to protect those fleeing war and conflict.
- Greece: Prime Minister Alexis Tsipras expressed condolences to President Hollande. He said: "Last night's bloody terrorist attack in Paris was a blind but targeted strike. It was a blow against Europe, home of democracy and freedom, a blow against multiculturalism." The Greek Ministry of Foreign Affairs issued the following announcement: "The Greek people as a whole are shocked at the cowardly, deadly terrorist attacks that took place a short while ago in Paris. These attacks are attacks not only against France, but also against the whole of the civilized world and democracy itself."
- Hungary: Prime Minister Viktor Orbán declared 15 November as a national day of mourning on state television, as an expression of solidarity with the French people, while warning that EU-imposed migrant quotas would spread terrorism in Europe. Orbán sent his condolences to the relatives of the victims and to every citizen of France. He added "Hungarian people stand by the French in these extremely difficult hours." Orbán rejected the concept of mandatory resettlement quotas. He reminded Europe that all of the terrorists in "are basically migrants ... [who] rejected Western values but still held EU passports" and indicated that there was a strong connection between terrorism and Muslim refugees. The Hungarian government decided to reinforce security measures countrywide, including the increasing of law enforcement presence in public areas and strengthen the protection of priority sites such as the Paks Nuclear Power Plant and Budapest Airport.
- Iceland: President Ólafur Ragnar Grímsson condemned the attacks, stating that they are an attack on the "civilization of our time, freedom, democracy and human rights." Foreign Minister Gunnar Bragi Sveinsson also added "It is clear that these were acts of barbaric extremism and will have to be met with calm and restraint. We stand behind the French nation during these critical times, mindful of the French values of freedom, equality and fraternity."
- Ireland: Taoiseach (Prime Minister) Enda Kenny in a statement said "My thoughts and those of all the Irish people are with the French people this evening. As ever we stand as one with them and will never bend to the evil of terrorism." He added on his official Twitter account: "This is a shocking attack on humanity. Our thoughts and prayers are with the victims and families. We stand with France tonight." President Michael D. Higgins said he was shocked to learn of the unfolding events, "On behalf of the Irish people and on my own behalf I offer deepest sympathy through president Hollande to the people of France on this dreadful loss of life and appalling injuries."
- Italy: Prime Minister Matteo Renzi condemned the attacks, stating that with the attack to France, terrorists "have struck the whole world." He also uploaded a video on YouTube with his public speech, in Italian, directed to the people and government of France. The Minister of the Interior Angelino Alfano said that the alert measures have been raised in the whole country and that the intelligence agents are now in direct contact with the French ones. It was also announced that the Italian government would spend €1 billion on both security and culture, saying that, "They want terror, we respond with culture that is stronger than ignorance."
- Latvia: President Raimonds Vējonis condemned the attacks, and offered support to France, stating "This is one of the darkest hours for France and a big challenge for the whole Europe, its people and values. Today we must be strong and united to support each other and work together to tackle the biggest challenges Europe is facing right now." The government declared Monday 16 November a day of national mourning.
- Lithuania: President Dalia Grybauskaitė condemned the attack and gave her condolences to the French people.
- Luxembourg: Luxembourg held a wreath laying ceremony was held at the French embassy in Luxembourg on the Monday following the attack. Flags were flown at half mast across the country and a minute of silence in memory of the victims was observed. Prime Minister Xavier Bettel attended the ceremony.
- Republic of Macedonia: President Gjorge Ivanov condemned the attacks, stating "We will not allow the terrorists to instill us with fear."
- Malta: Prime Minister Joseph Muscat said that Malta's "solidarity goes out to [Francois Hollande] and people of France". He also announced that Malta would observe a minute's silence on Monday and ordered that the Maltese flag be flown at half mast on the Prime Ministers office, the Auberge de Castille.
- Republic of Moldova: The Moldovan Parliament condemned the attacks and expressed Moldova's solidarity. Speaker Andrian Candu stated "My thoughts are with the injured people. I hope both physical and moral wounds will heal as quickly as possible." 16 November was a day of national mourning.
- Monaco: Prince Albert II wrote an open letter to Hollande, expressing condolences on the behalf of Monaco.
- Montenegro: President Milo Đukanović offered support to France, saying that Montenegro "stands beside France in these difficult moments."
- Netherlands: Prime Minister Mark Rutte said: "Our thoughts are by the victims and their relatives. This is disgraceful, the whole nation empathizes with France. France can count on our support."
- Norway: King Harald V, Prime Minister Erna Solberg and Foreign Minister Børge Brende all sent their condolences, condemning the attacks.
- Poland: President Andrzej Duda declared his grief and solidarity over the attacks. Polish Minister for European affairs declared that Poland in wake of the attacks will renounce the EU plan for relocation of Middle Eastern refugees. A few days later however, the new Prime Minister of Poland Beata Szydło stated that Poland would indeed honor the commitment the previous government had made to accept thousands of refugees as part of EU's Relocation Plan, while also requesting the EU to change its decision on refugees. The decision to accept refugees may be contrary to a previous suggestion made by another member of her government that Syrian refugees might be sent back to Syria. However, Szydlo also made it clear the "government's top priority is the security of Poles."
- Portugal: President Aníbal Cavaco Silva expressed his great consternation about the terrorist attacks in Paris and the high number of deaths, and the President of the Assembly of the Republic Eduardo Ferro Rodrigues sent a message to the President of the French National Assembly expressing his sincere condolences on behalf of himself and the Parliament. Also, the Prime Minister Pedro Passos Coelho and the opposition leader António Costa have expressed condolences and solidarity in letters to the French President. A French flag was unfurled on the façade of the Assembly of the Republic from 14 to 18 November. The Minister of Culture, the Mayor of Lisbon, the Ambassador of France and the representative of the Islamic community in Portugal were present in the lighting up of the Tower of Belém and the Mayor of Porto was present in the lighting up of the Rivoli Theatre. All condemned the terrorist acts.
- Romania: President Klaus Iohannis expressed his regrets about the incident and his sympathy with the French people, also calling for more determination in fighting terrorism. Other Romanian politicians also expressed solidarity with France and The French embassy in Bucharest opened an online condolence log on its website.

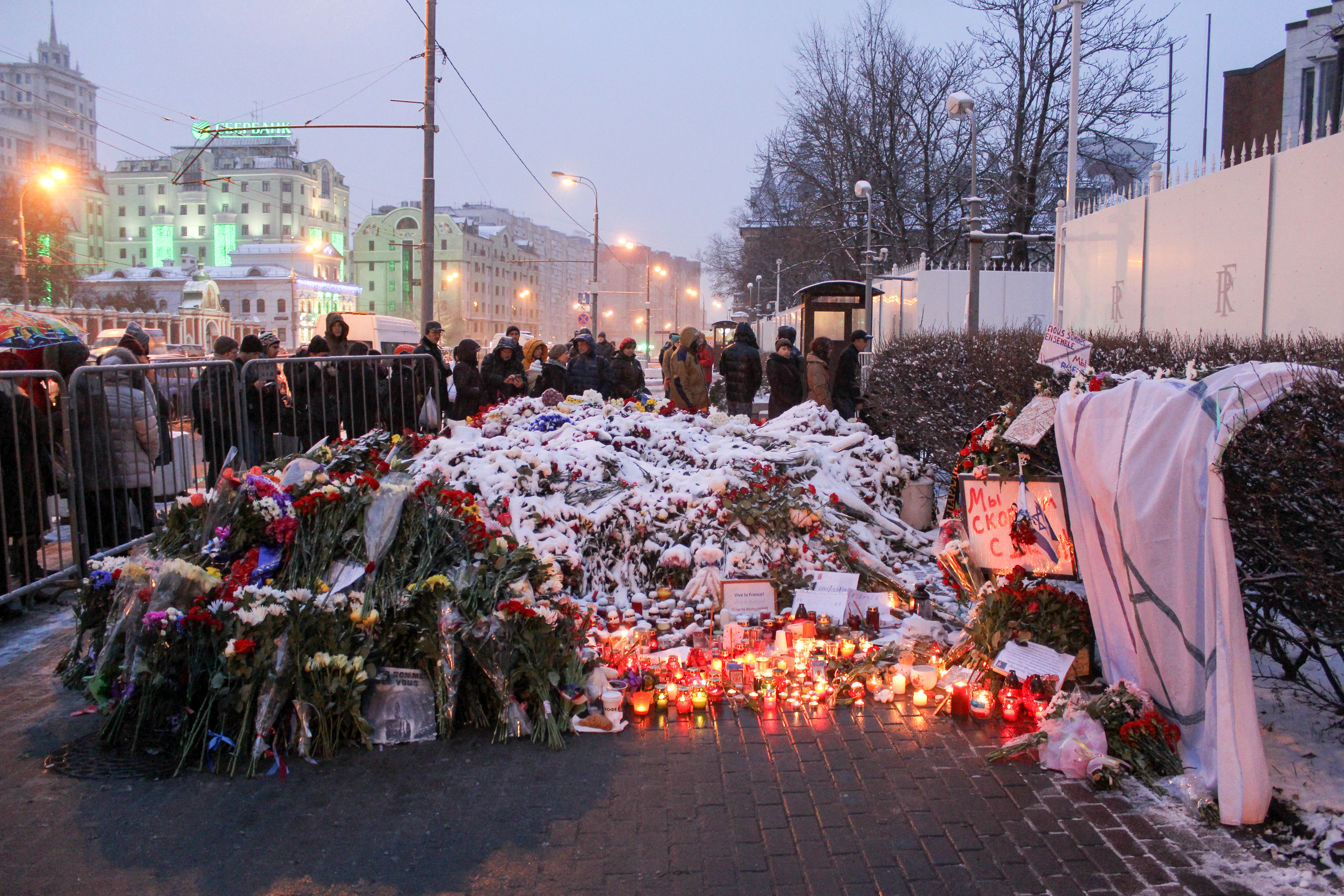
French Embassy in Moscow, Russia, 15 November 2015

- Russia: President Vladimir Putin sent condolences and words of solidarity to Hollande and the French people, as well as the families and friends of the victims "in connection with the death of a large number of peaceful citizens in an unprecedented series of terrorist acts in Paris." The tragedy was an "additional proof of the barbaric nature of terrorism that is posing a challenge to human civilisation," he stressed. Dmitry Medvedev, the Prime Minister of Russia, expressed condolences on behalf of the government and personally to his French counterpart Manuel Valls, calling to unite in the fight against extremism.
- Serbia: President Tomislav Nikolić sent condolences to President Hollande and the people of France, stating "The dreadful news from Paris left us speechless, but you should know that, as always throughout history, we stand by France with fierce determination ready to offer help whenever needed." Prime Minister Aleksandar Vucic also sent a letter of condolence, saying "We are a small country, we cannot help a lot, but if there is anything we can do, we will be there. We offer full support to the French people and government in combating the greatest plague of the modern world – terrorism." Flags were lowered to half-mast for three days.
- Slovakia: President Andrej Kiska condemned the attacks, stating "We are shocked, we are sad and we are outraged." Foreign Minister Miroslav Lajčák issued an official statement saying "We also express our solidarity and full support of France in fighting terrorism." Robert Fico, the Prime Minister, pointed out risks associated with immigration saying "Hopefully, some people will open their eyes now". He said that the attacks in Paris proved him right about the links between Middle East migrants and security. Since he considered Muslims as a potential threat after the attacks in Paris, Fico said they were being closely monitored in Slovakia, the Reuters news agency reported.
- Slovenia: President Borut Pahor made a joint statement with President Poroshenko of Ukraine, in Lviv, saying that "In these difficult moments Ukraine and Slovenia mourn together with the French nation for terrible losses and express solidarity with victims and their families."
- Spain: Prime Minister Mariano Rajoy sent to the French Prime Minister Manuel Valls condolences from Spain and he was interested about the critical situation in France. Rajoy also offered collaboration with Spanish National Police Force and the Spanish National Intelligence Agency. Spanish Prime Minister gathered with the Spanish counter-terrorist pact and decided to not increase the counter-terrorist alert which was at 4/5 nivel. The Spanish king, Felipe VI and the Spanish Royal House also offered condolences to the French people.
- Sweden: King Carl XVI Gustaf of Sweden "I feel a tremendous sorrow and my thoughts go out to all those affected, especially to the victims and their loved ones. These attacks are an attack on our shared societies and its values, and the way we wish to live. I am among those who feel alarm and dismay. It is vitally important that we stand together today against these unfathomable acts of terrorisms." Vice prime minister Åsa Romson tweeted "The very serious attacks in Paris just now may obstruct the Climate Change Conference in December", during the attacks, which caused a lot of criticism in Sweden due to 'wrong priorities'.
- Switzerland: President Simonetta Sommaruga said "these attacks are against all our deepest societal and human values. Our hearts are with those close to the victims and those hurt" and "we stand together with the French government and will work with them to analyse the security situation in our country."
- Turkey: President Recep Tayyip Erdoğan said, "Turkey knows very well the meaning of terror and its results. We are sharing the pain of both President Hollande and the French people, and I extend my condolences to our French friends." Turkish Prime Minister Ahmet Davutoğlu expressed his condolences and added "These attacks are not only aimed at the French people, but also democracy, freedom and universal values; terror has no religion, nation nor any value it represents."
- Ukraine: President Petro Poroshenko said he was "shocked" and feels "solidarity with people of France," noticing that "terrorism is our common enemy." Later he laid flowers near the French embassy in Kyiv, as well as Prime Minister Arseniy Yatsenyuk and other cabinet members. In Lviv President made a joint Statement with President of the Republic of Slovenia Borut Pahor, "calling on the G20 leaders to agree upon inclusive set of measures to address the increasing security challenge" and noticing that "Ukraine and Slovenia are ready to join the global anti-terrorist response."

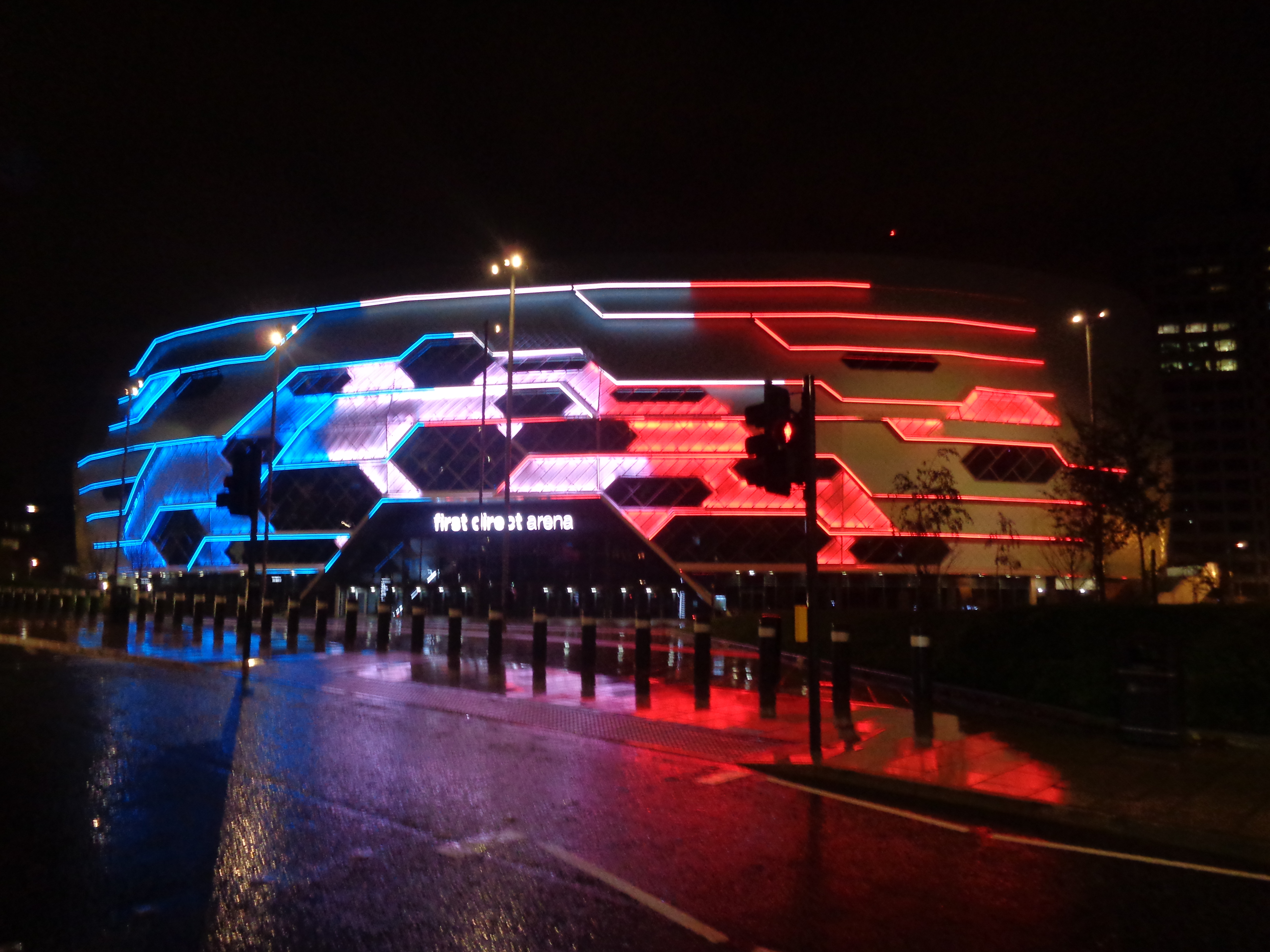
First Direct Arena in Leeds lit up in French tricolours after the attacks

- United Kingdom: Prime Minister David Cameron said he was "shocked" by the "horrifying and sickening" attack, and pledged that the UK and France would stand together "in sorrow, but unbowed." while the Leader of the Opposition, Jeremy Corbyn cancelled a planned speech in response to the attacks, which he described as "heinous and immoral" and said "We stand in solidarity with the French." Corbyn also laid flowers at the French Embassy and wrote to Hollande. The Union Flag was flown at half-mast alongside French tricolour also flying at half-mast above 10 Downing Street and many other government buildings. British Security Services will recruit 1,900 additional intelligence and security staff to counter violent extremism following the attacks.
  - Bermuda: Premier Michael Dunkley said that the people of Bermuda condemned "this heinous terrorist attack in Paris," which he described as a "tragic and shocking incident." He contacted the French consulate on the island to offer any assistance possible.
  - Northern Ireland: The First and deputy First Ministers Peter Robinson and Martin McGuinness issued a joint statement which said "Our thoughts, prayers and sympathies are with the French people and we stand shoulder to shoulder with President Hollande and France following these savage, barbaric and cowardly terrorist attacks in Paris."
  - Scotland: First Minister Nicola Sturgeon visited the French consulate in Edinburgh to sign a book of condolence and wrote that "The thoughts and prayers of Scotland are with the people of France tonight."
  - Wales: First Minister Carwyn Jones described the events as "awful" and postponed a reception for the Welsh football team as a "mark of respect."
  - Gibraltar: Chief Minister Fabian Picardo expressed his condolences. The Moorish Castle was lit up in the colours of the French Flag, with all flags at half mast.
  - Guernsey: Chief Minister Jonathan Le Tocq said "I learned with dismay the heinous attack in Paris. Our thoughts are heading to the bereaved families & all our French friends".
  - Jersey: Chief Minister Ian Gorst expressed his condolences in a public letter to President Hollande.
- Vatican City: Pope Francis condemned the attacks, saying "I want to strongly reaffirm that the path of violence and hatred doesn't solve the problems of humanity! To use the name of God to justify this path is a blasphemy!" Vatican press director Father Federico Lombardi issued an official statement from the Vatican, stating "We are shocked by this new manifestation of maddening, terrorist violence and hatred which we condemn in the most radical way together with the Pope and all those who love peace."

==== Oceania ====
- Australia: Prime Minister Malcolm Turnbull expressed solidarity with France saying "In France and Australia, all around the world, we stand shoulder to shoulder with the people of France and with all free peoples in the battle against terrorism." In light of the attacks Turnbull also added that Australian authorities do not believe that there are any impending terrorist attacks on Australian soil to justify raising of the terror threat alert level in the country. Governor-General Sir Peter Cosgrove also condemned the attacks, stating that "today we're all to some degree French".
- Fiji: Prime Minister Frank Bainimarama released a statement saying "Every Fijian shares my horror at the terrorist attacks in Paris. On behalf of the Fijian Government and Fijian people, I want to express both our deepest condolences and our unwavering solidarity with the people of France" and described the nature of the attacks on innocent people as "especially horrifying".
- New Zealand: Prime Minister John Key expressed his condolences to the victims "our hearts go out to those involved and our thoughts with them and their families" and pledged that New Zealand would stand with France in the fight against terrorism.
- Samoa: Prime Minister Tuilaepa Sailele Malielegaoi sent a letter to French President François Hollande in which he condemned the "evil and vile" attacks, which he said had "also targeted common humanity and universal values of freedom".

==== Partially recognized states ====
- Kosovo: President Atifete Jahjaga declared 15 November a day of mourning in Kosovo in honour of the victims with flags on all state buildings both in Kosovo and abroad flown at half mast. Prime Minister Isa Mustafa stated "In these difficult moments, we share the pain of the people and institutions of France, but also the democratic world, which should be mobilised vigorously to defeat the evil that is threatening humanity". Hashim Thaçi the Minister of Foreign Affairs sent a telegram to his counterparts saying that the institutions and the people of Kosovo stands with the French people in a hard time for France and the families of victims.
- Northern Cyprus: President Mustafa Akıncı has condemned the attacks in a statement that he said "a complete atrocity took place in Paris. I share the deep sadness for the suffering of the French people. We always have to struggle in solidarity against crimes against humanity."
- Republic of China (Taiwan): President Ma Ying-jeou and the two major candidates in the upcoming presidential election of the Republic of China condemned the attacks. "We stand side by side with the French people in condemning the violence and hoping that order will be restored as soon as possible," said Ma.

== World landmarks illuminated in the colours of the French flag ==
Media related to Buildings illuminated as memorials to the November 2015 Paris attacks at Wikimedia Commons

Following the attacks, multiple landmarks around the world were lit in the colours of the French flag.

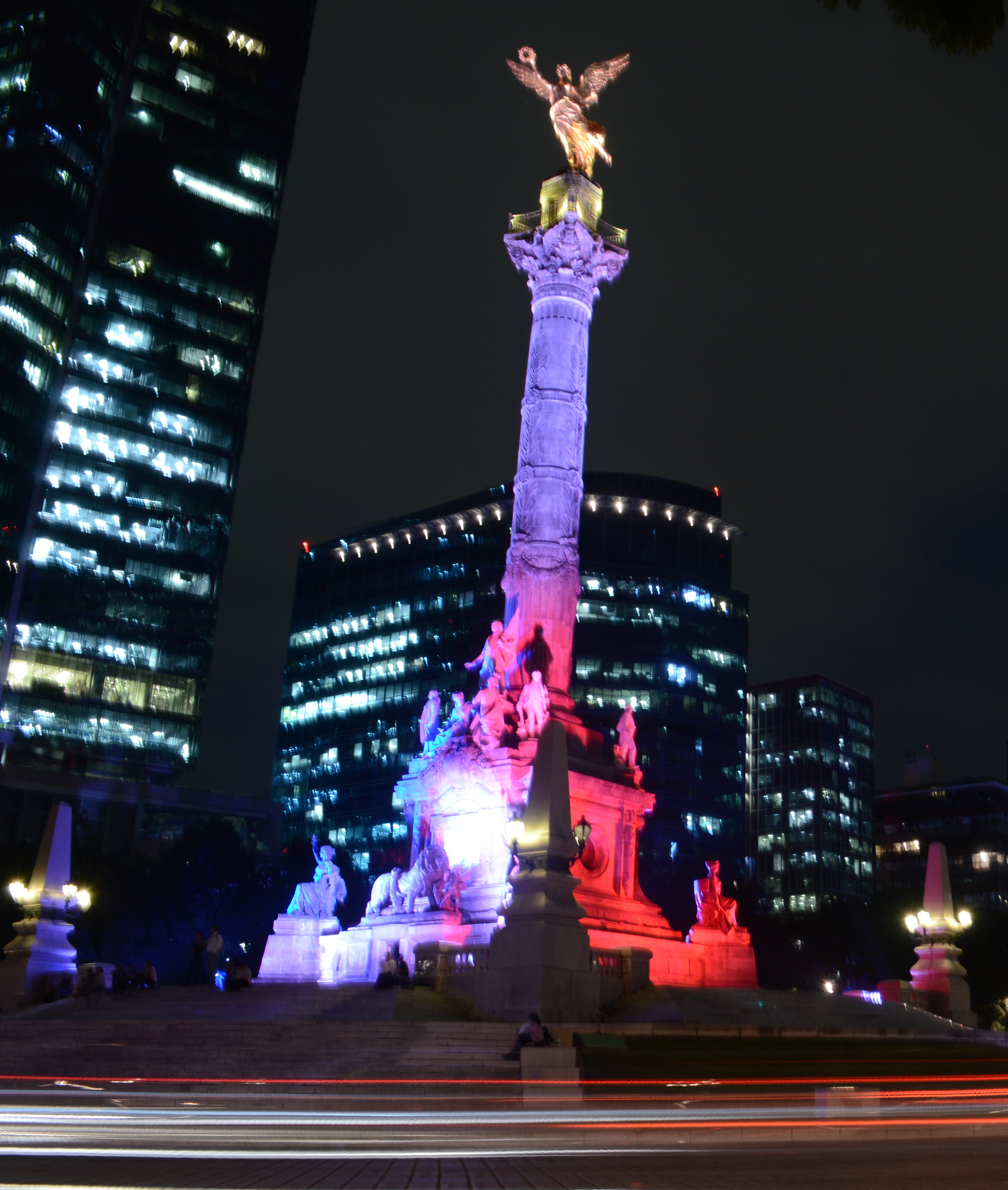
Angel of Independence, Mexico City, Mexico

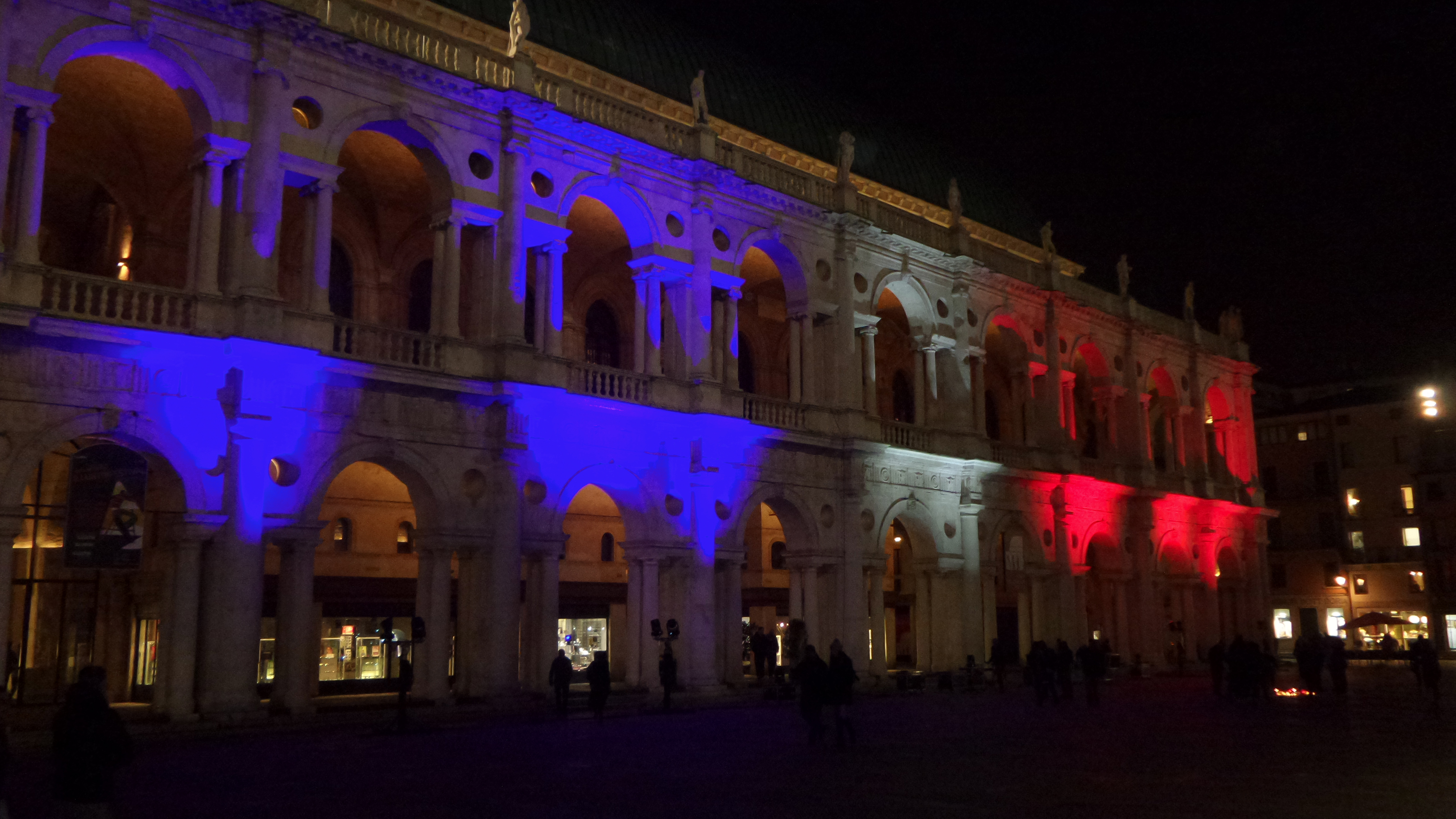
Basilica Palladiana, Vicenza, Italy

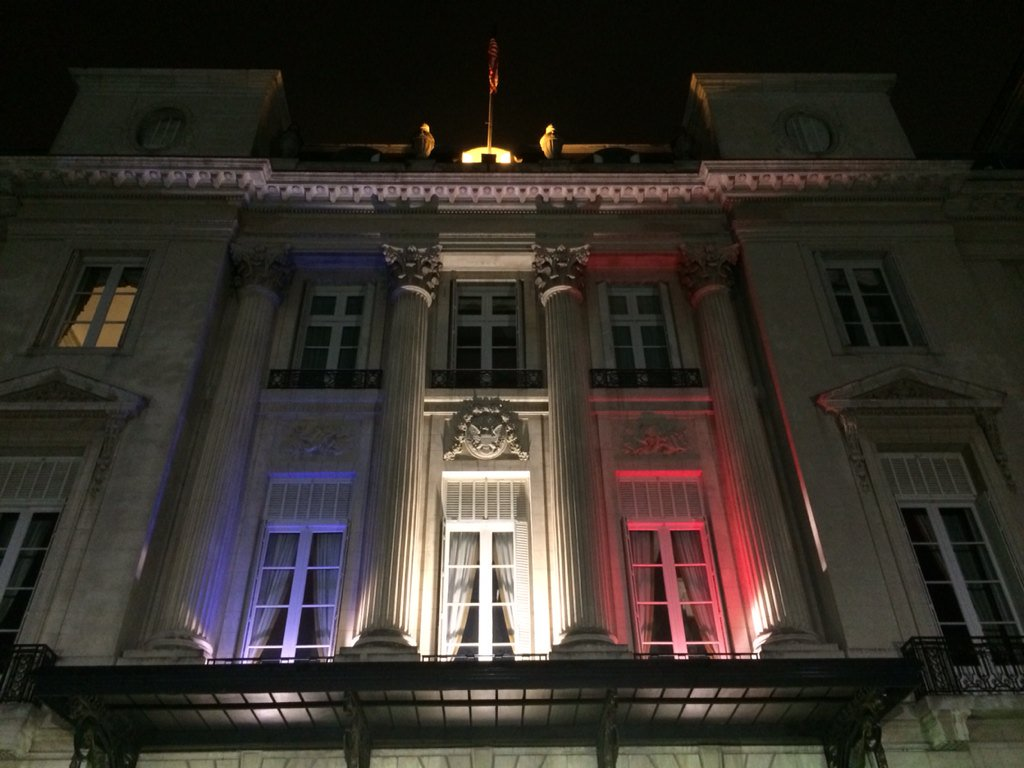
Bosch Palace, Buenos Aires, Argentina

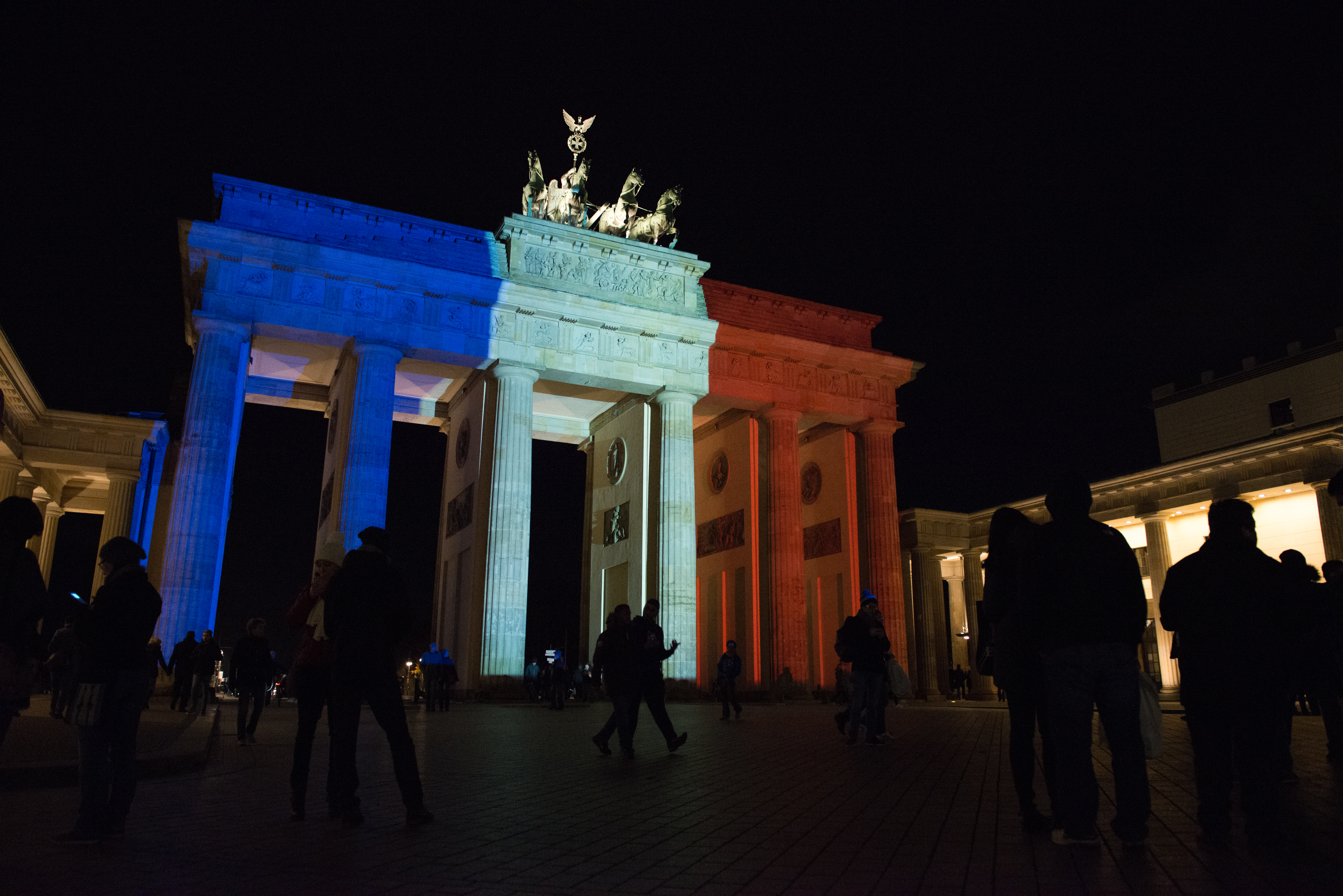
Brandenburg Gate, Berlin, Germany

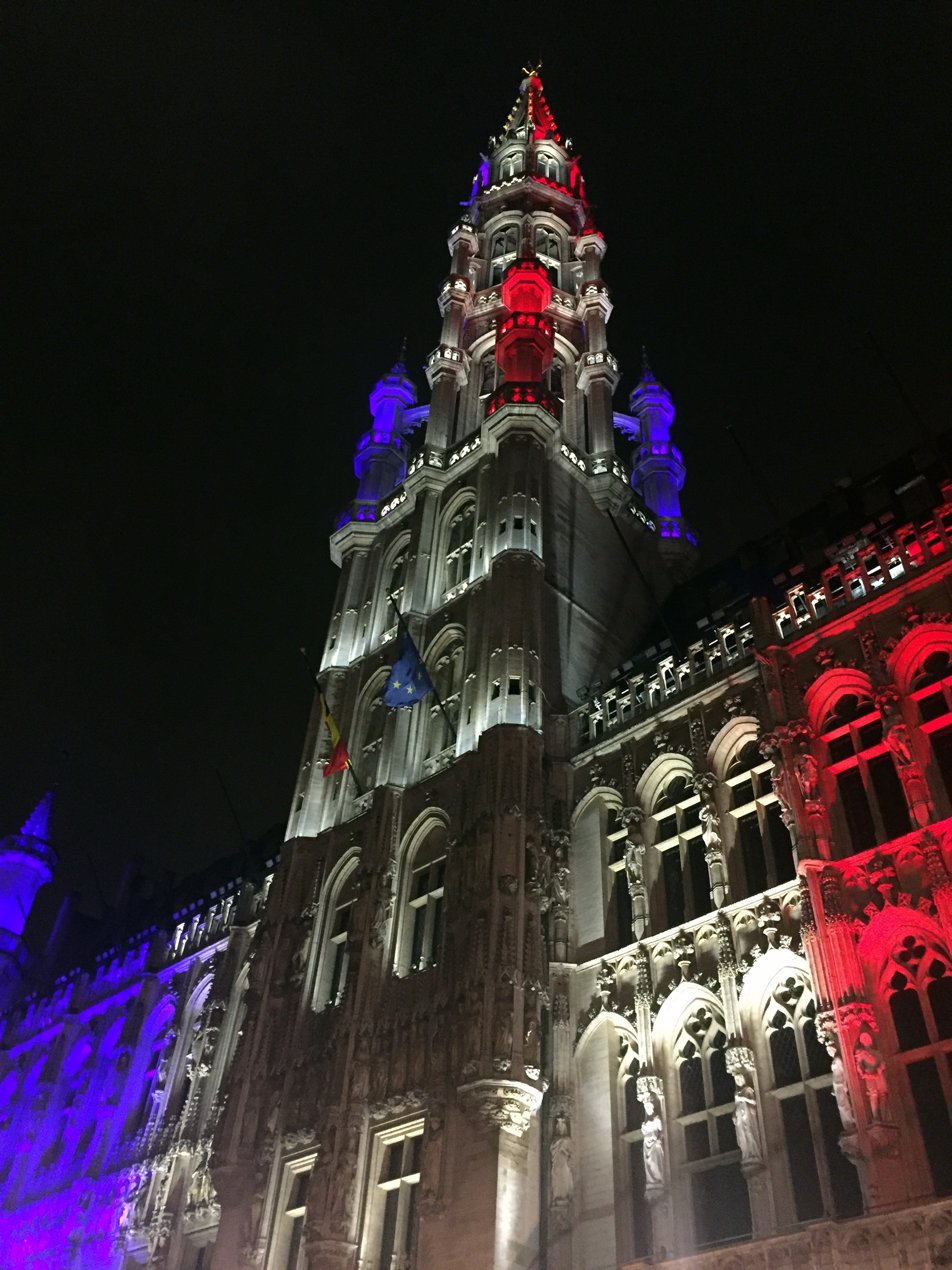
Brussels Town Hall, Belgium

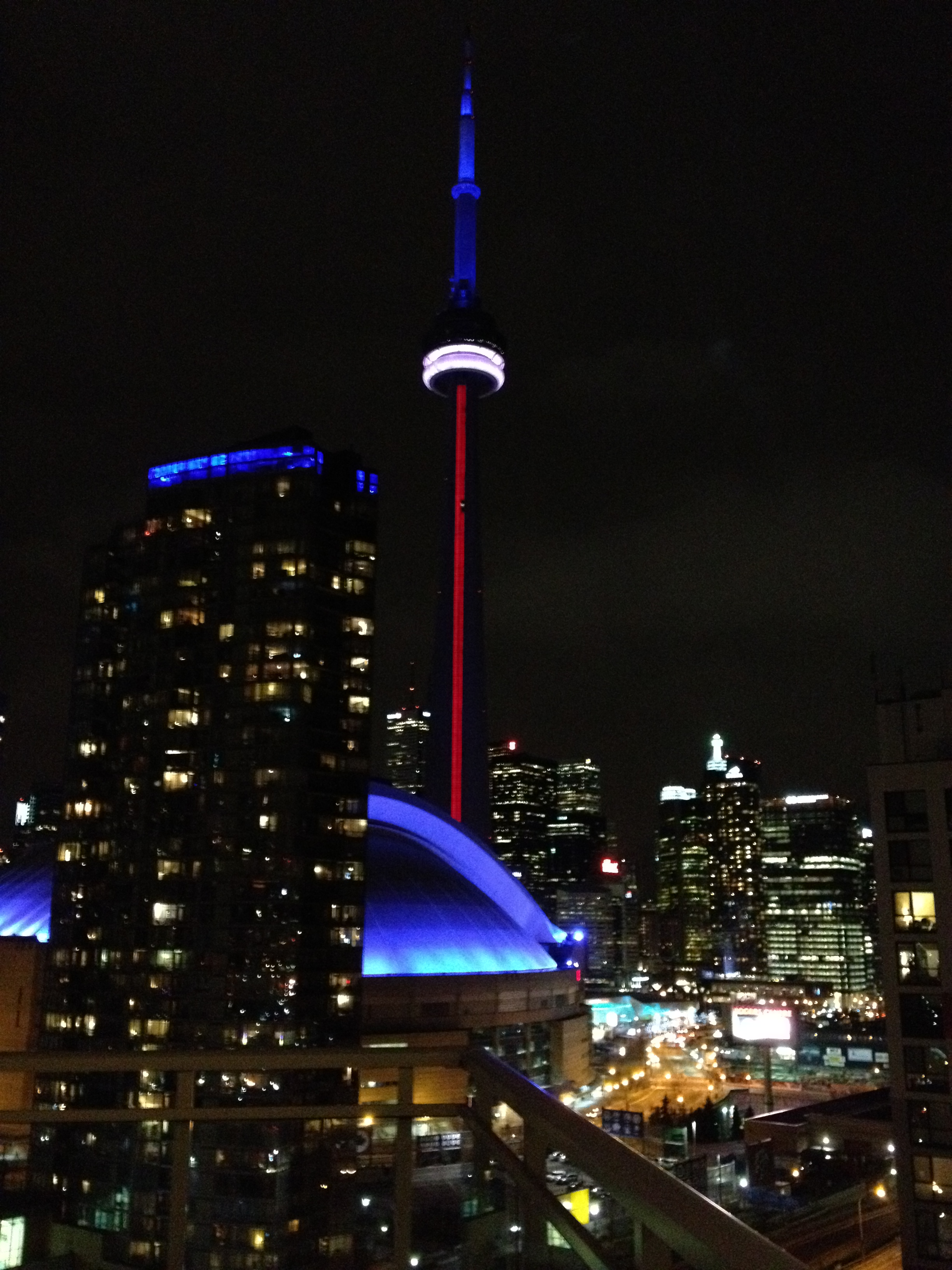
CN Tower, Toronto, Canada

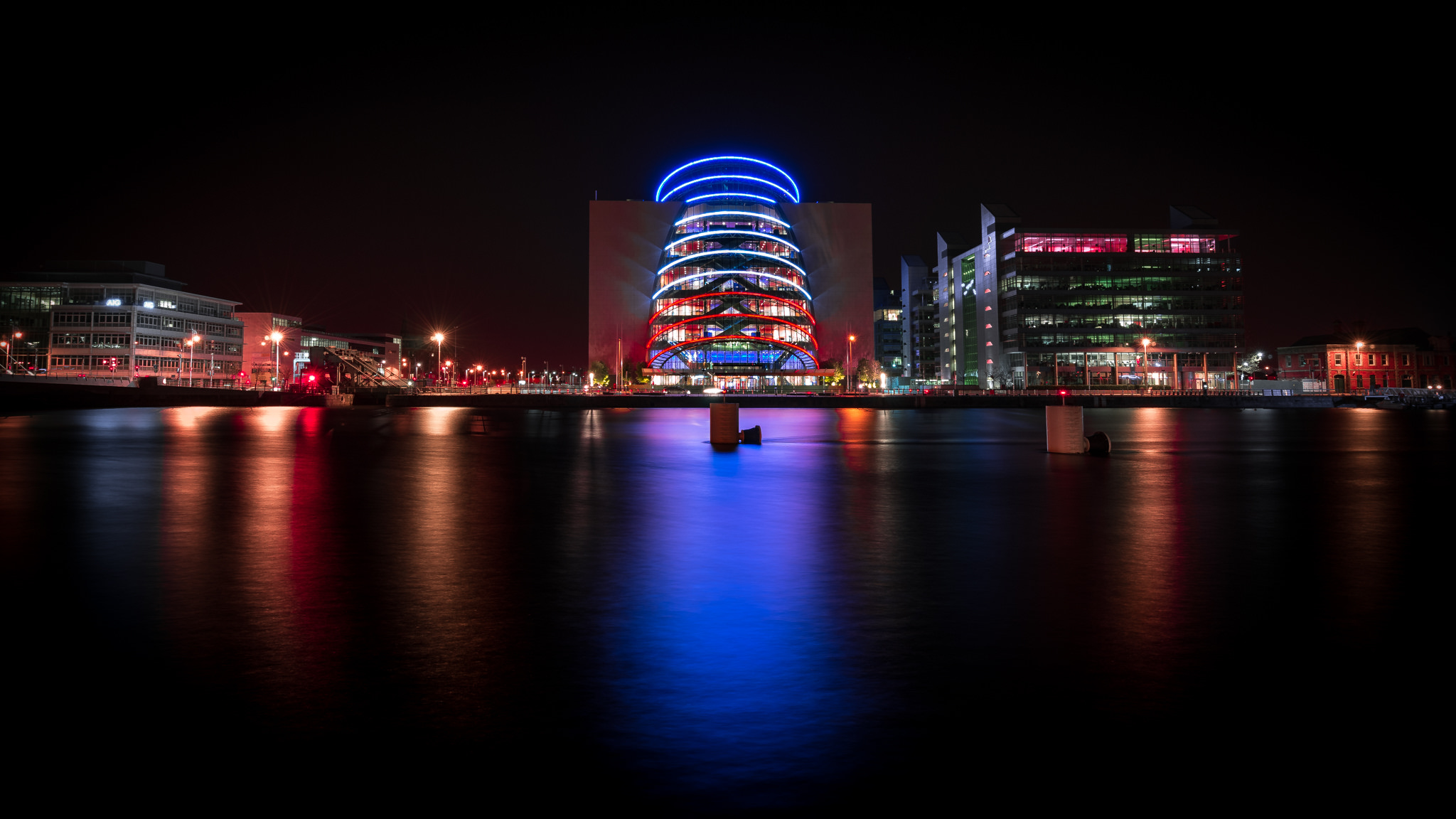
Convention Centre Dublin, Ireland

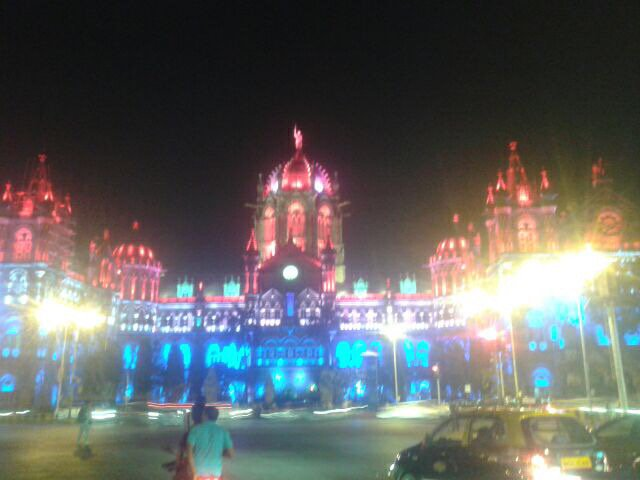
Chhatrapati Shivaji Maharaj Terminus, Mumbai, India

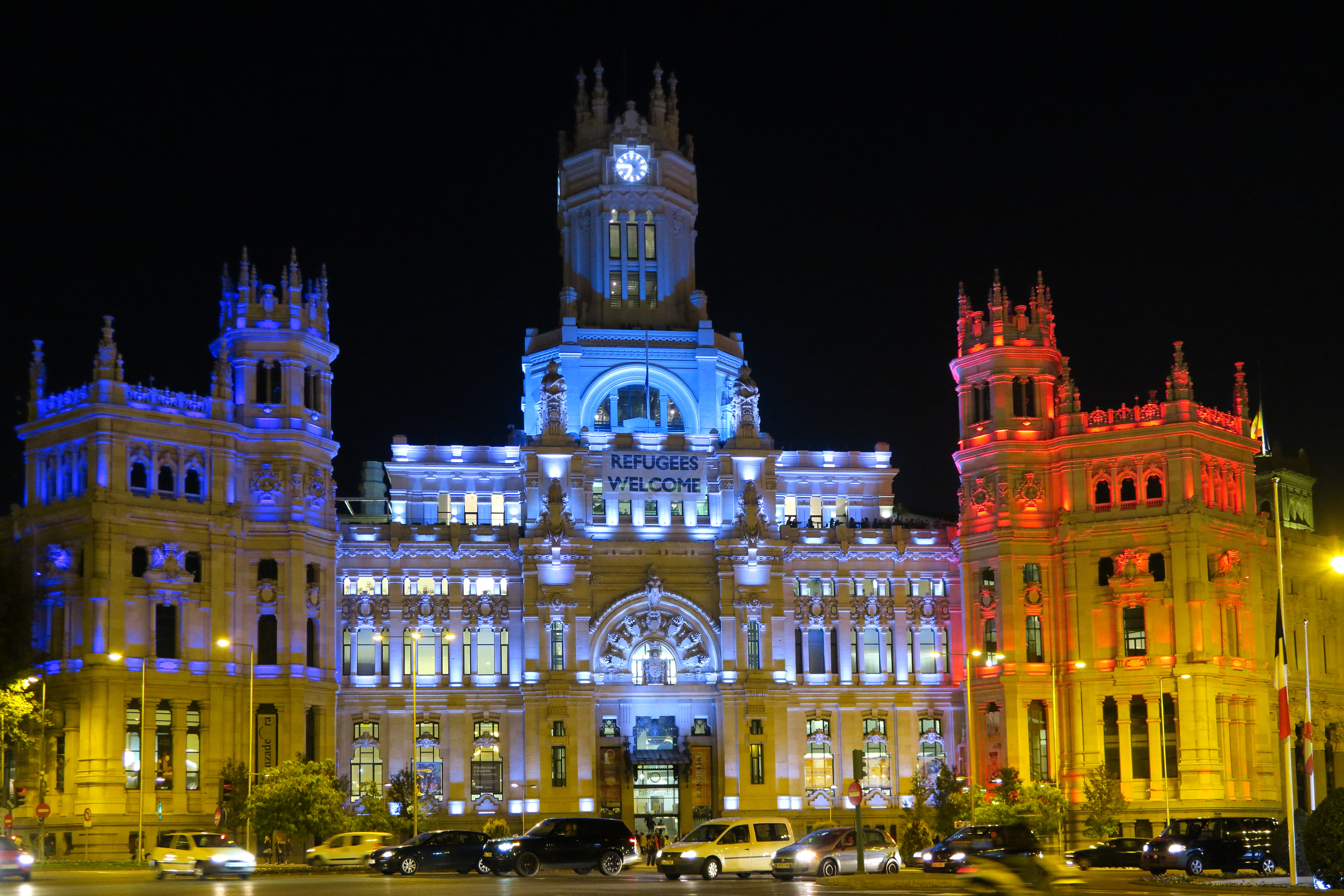
Cybele Palace, Madrid, Spain

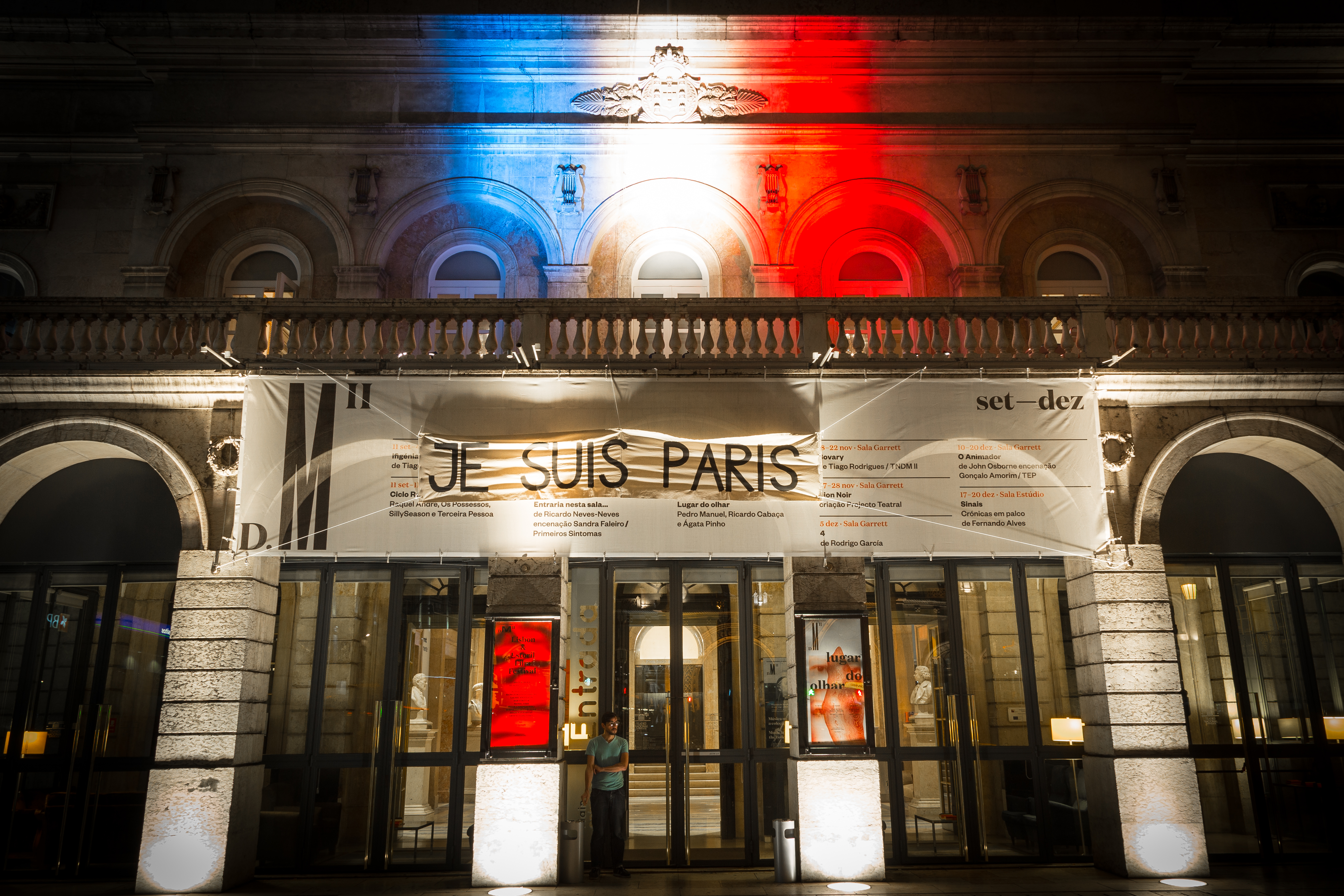
D. Maria II National Theatre, Lisbon, Portugal

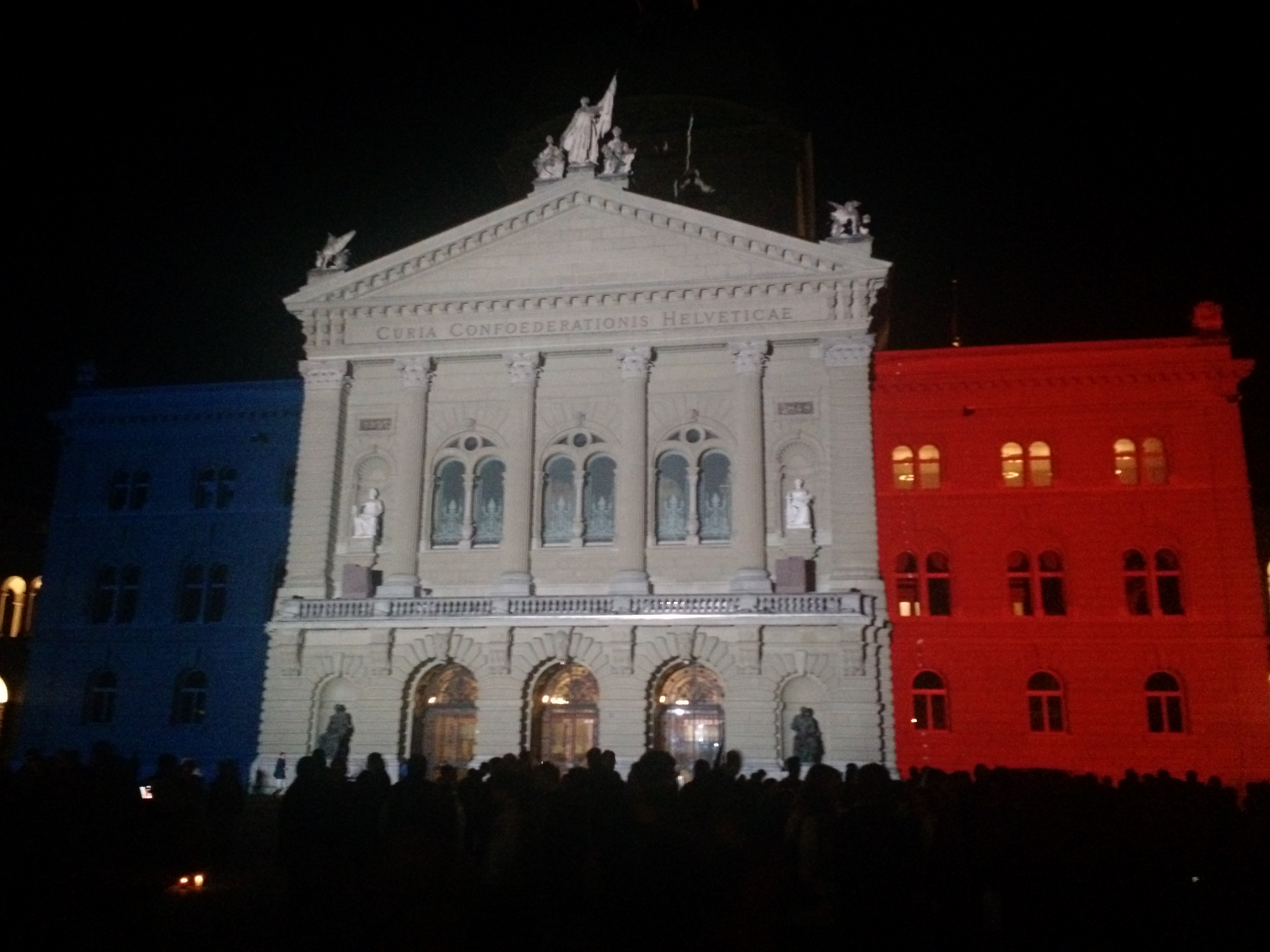
Federal Palace, Bern, Switzerland

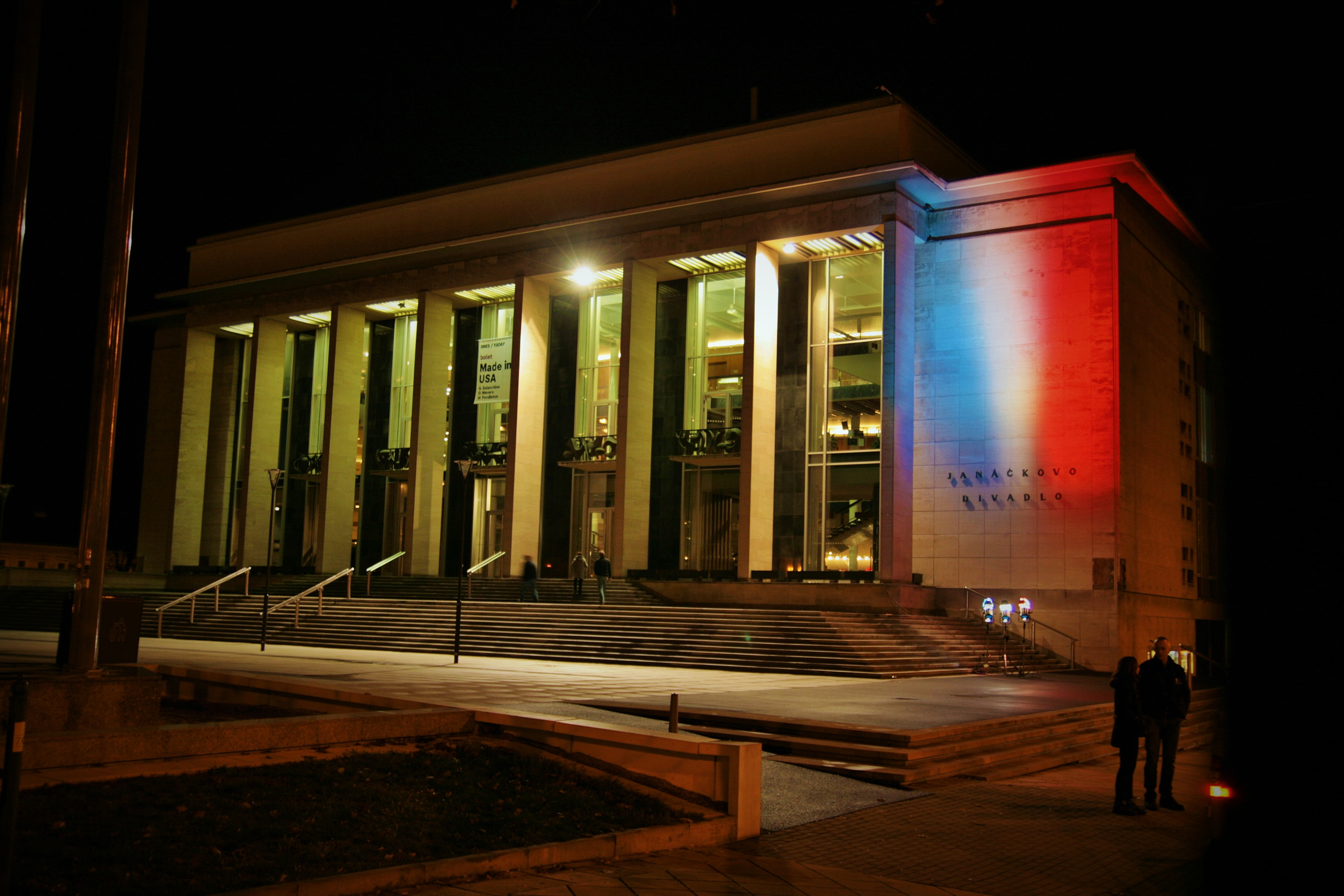
Janáček Theatre, Brno, Czech Republic

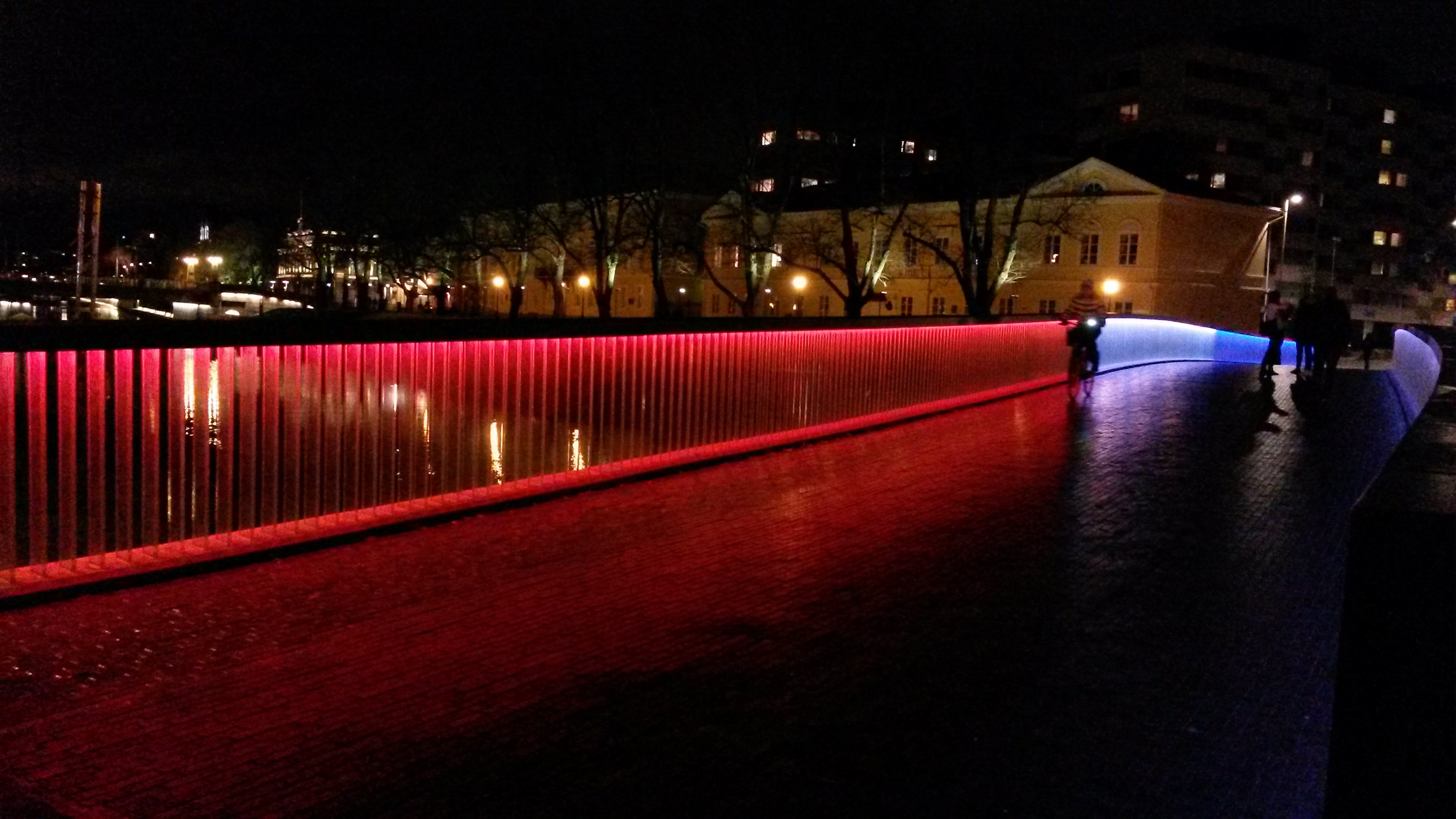
Kirjastosilta, Turku, Finland

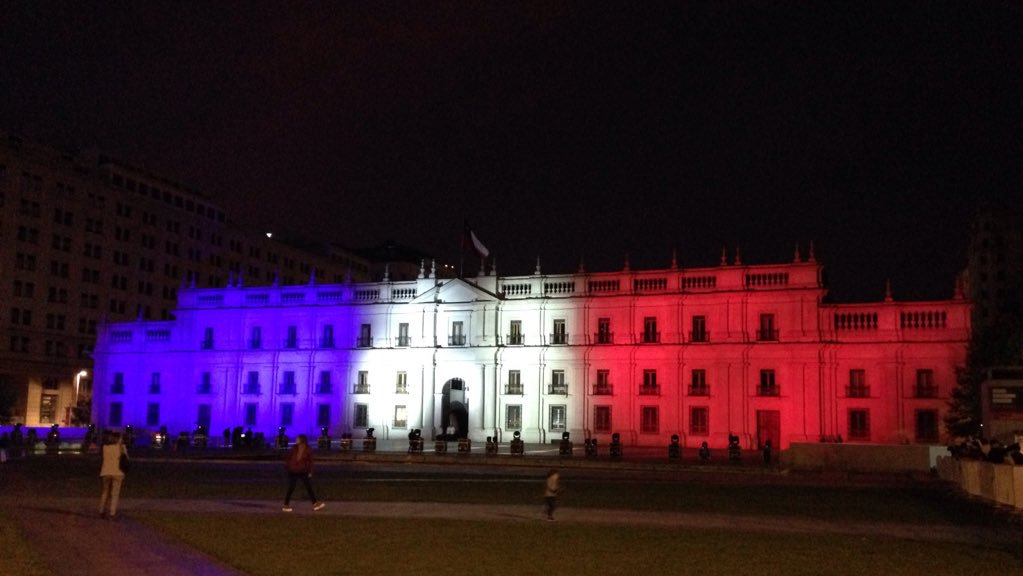
La Moneda, Santiago, Chile

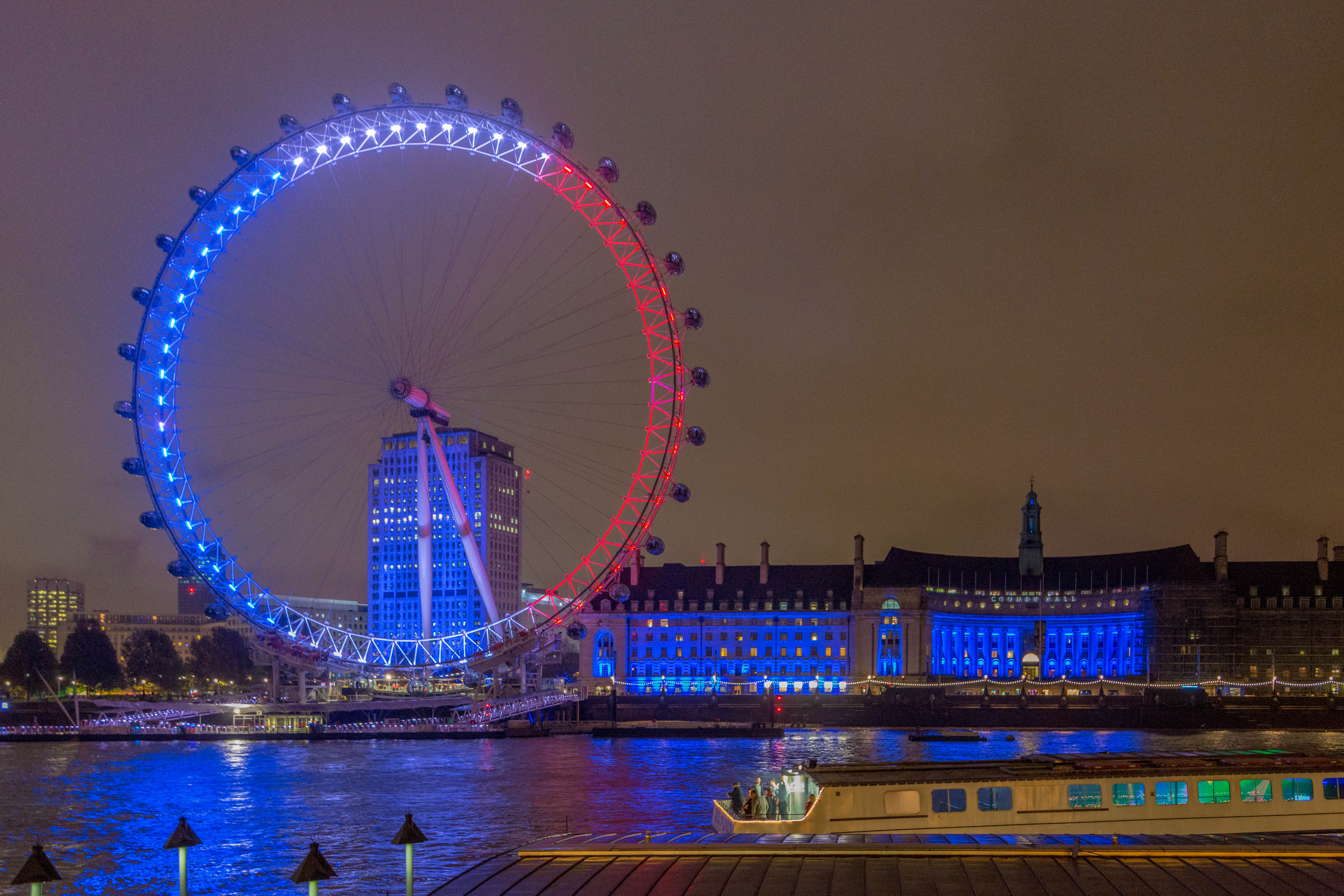
London Eye, U.K.

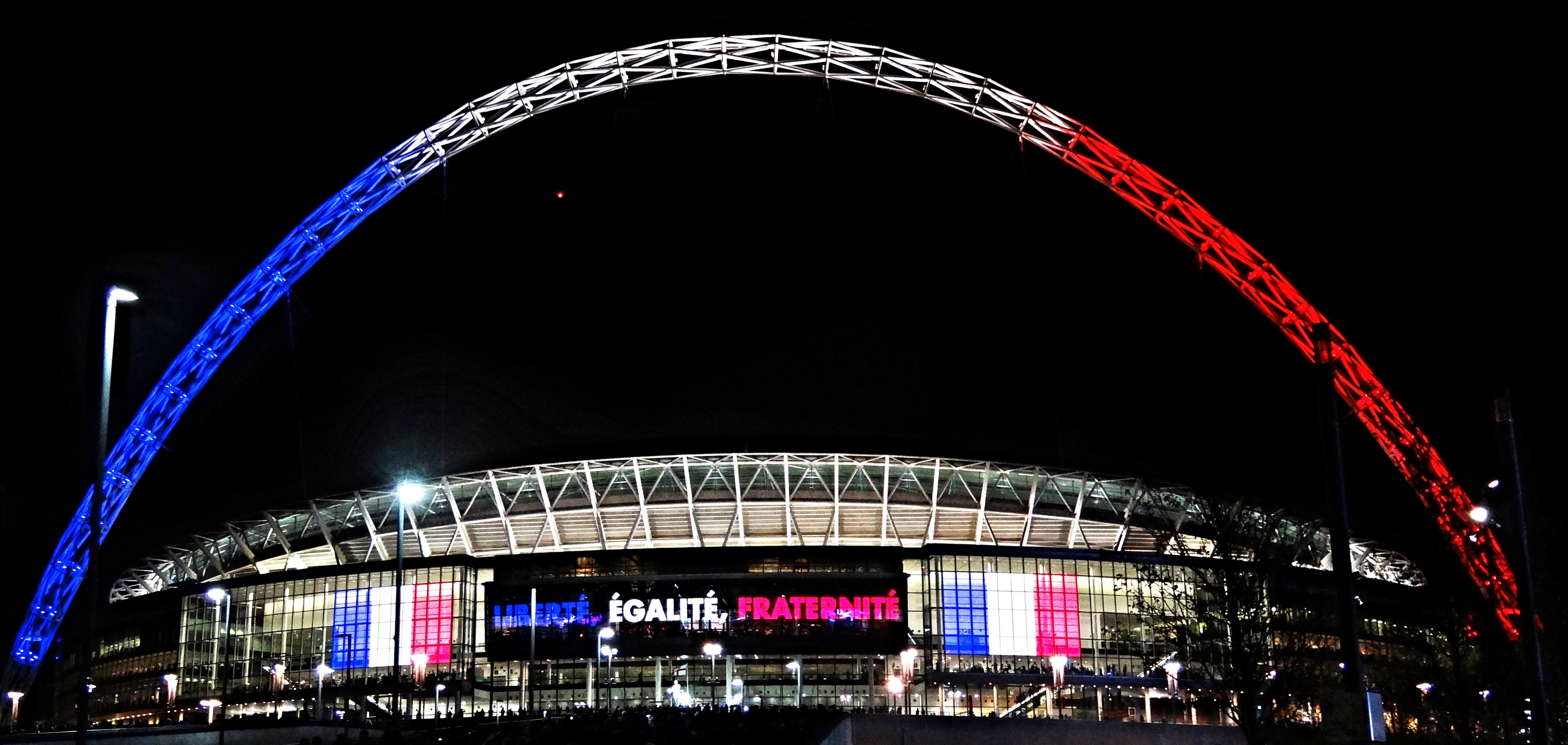
Wembley Stadium, London, U.K.

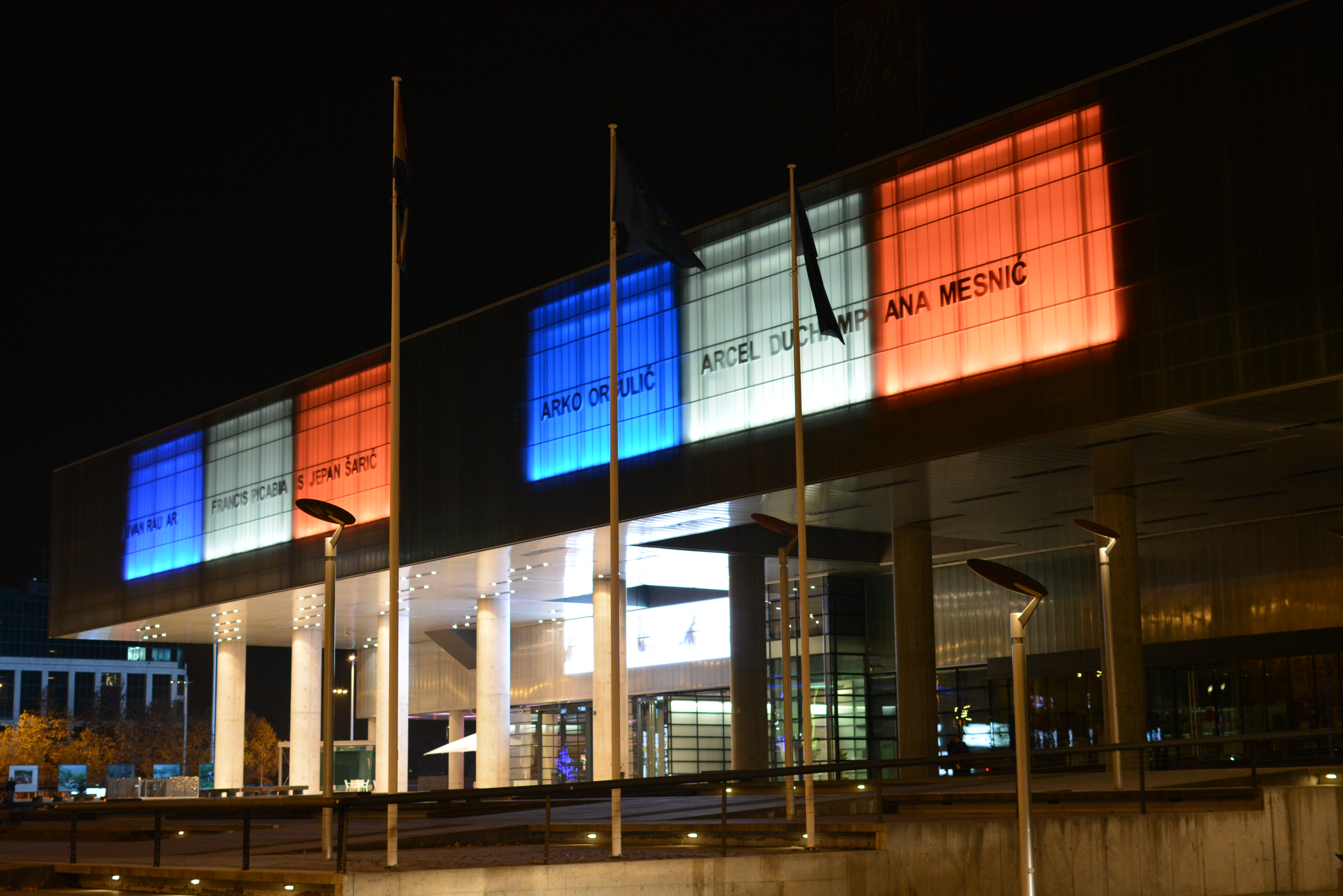
Museum of Contemporary Art, Zagreb, Croatia

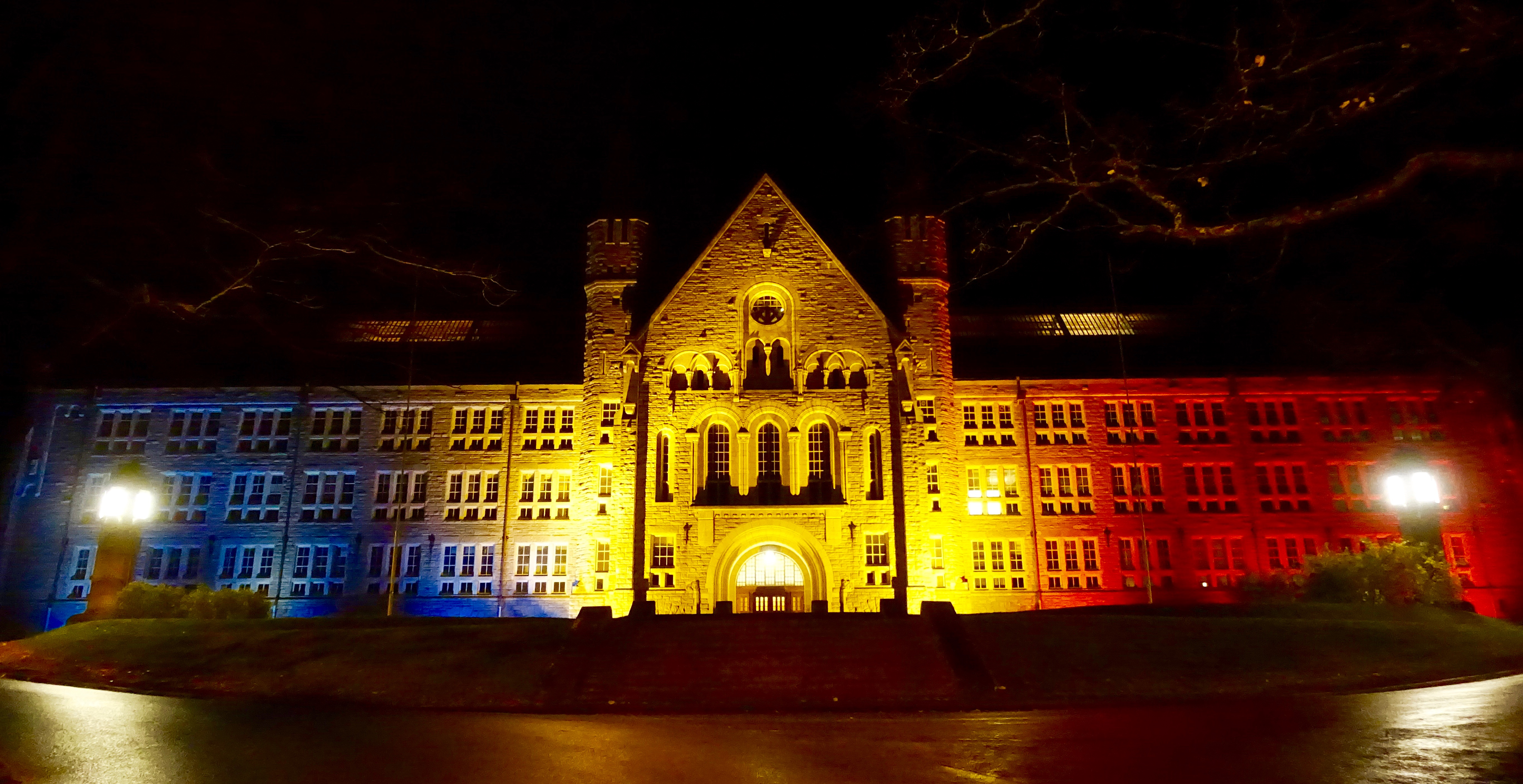
Norwegian University of Science and Technology, Trondheim, Norway

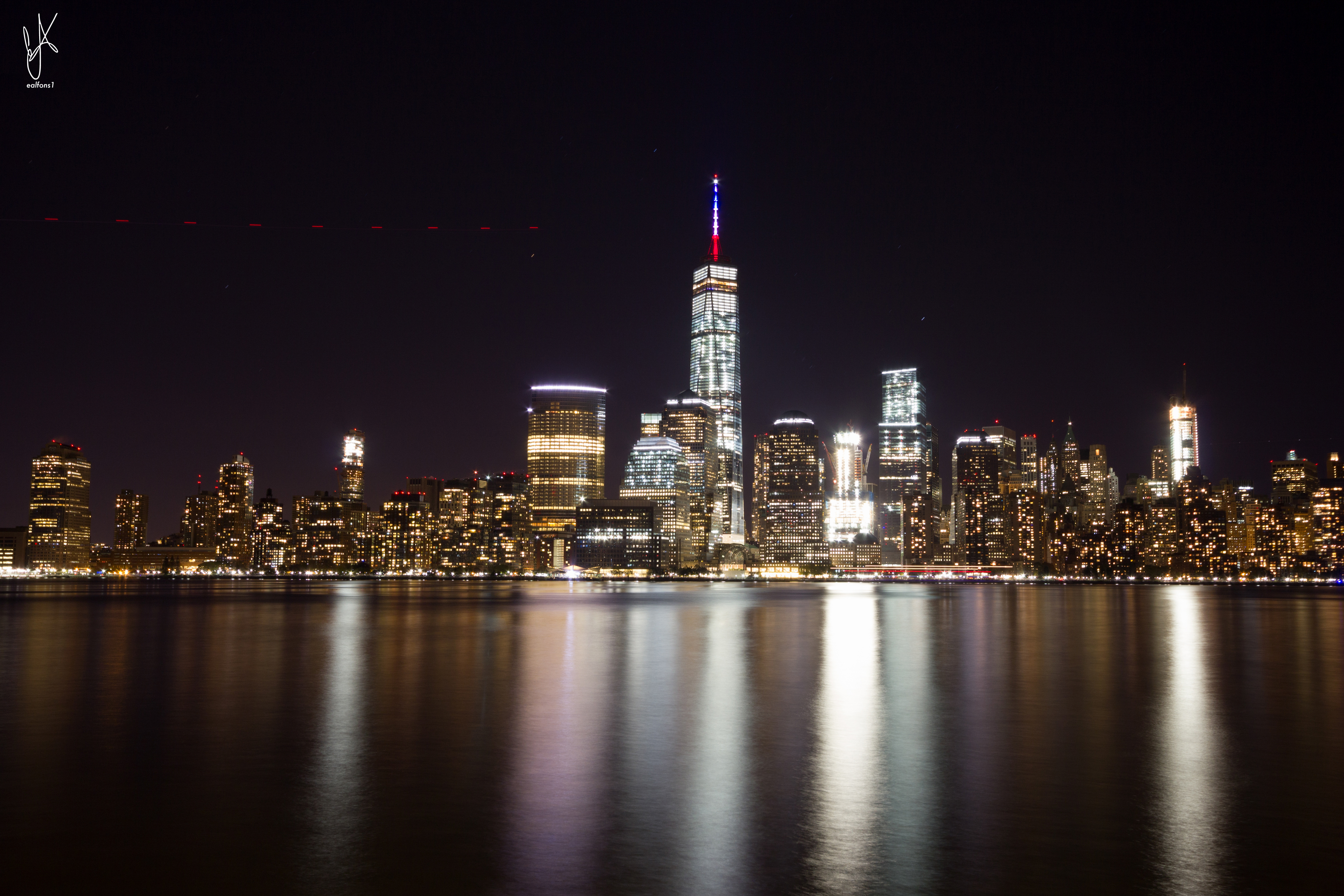
One World Trade Center, New York City, U.S.

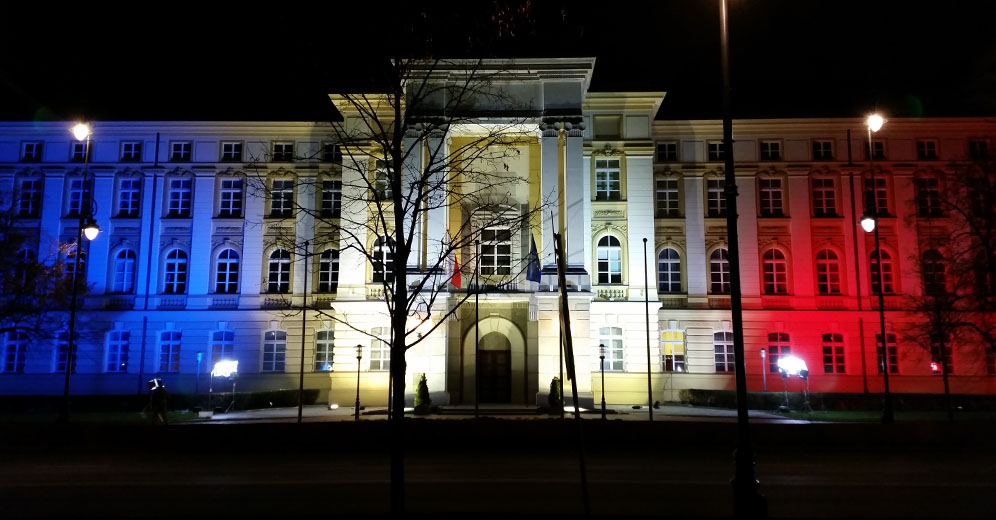
Polish Chancellery, Warsaw, Poland

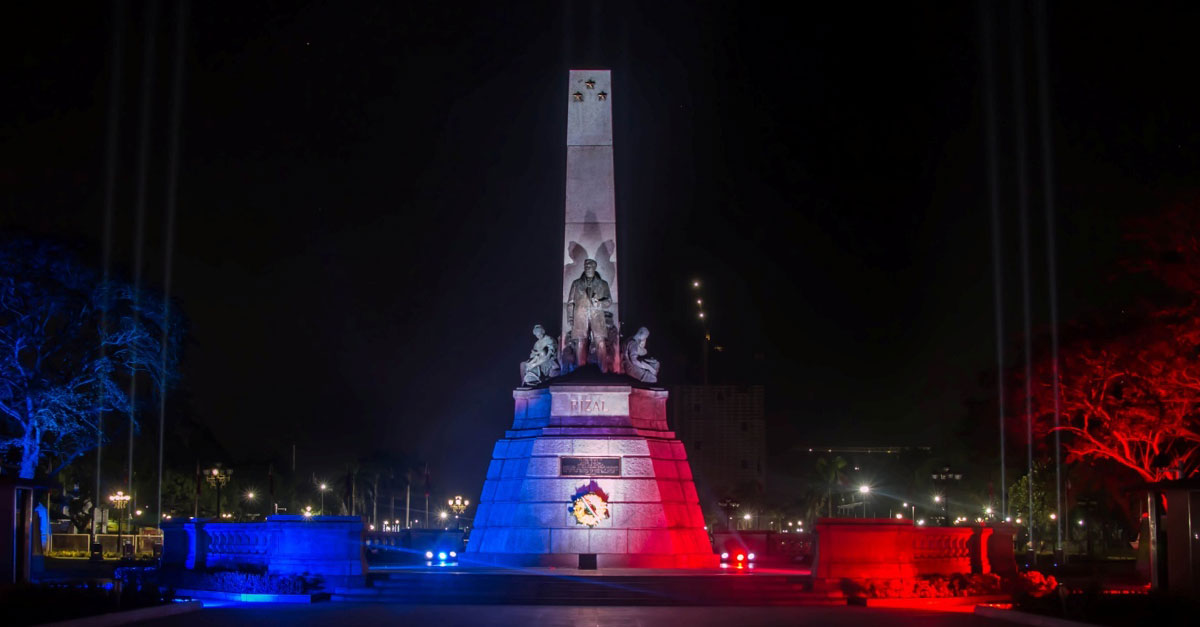
Rizal Monument, Manila, Philippines

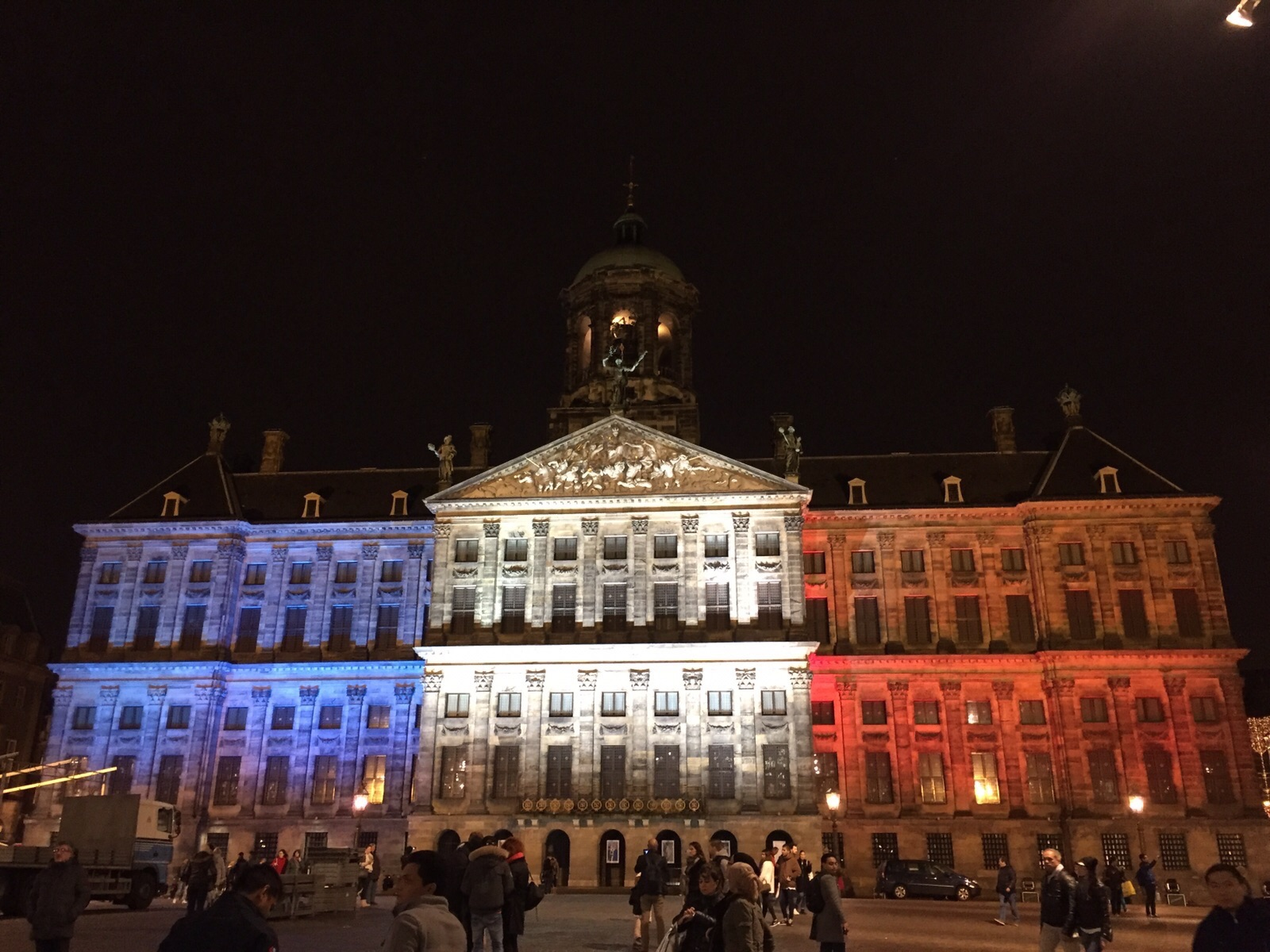
Royal Palace of Amsterdam, Netherlands

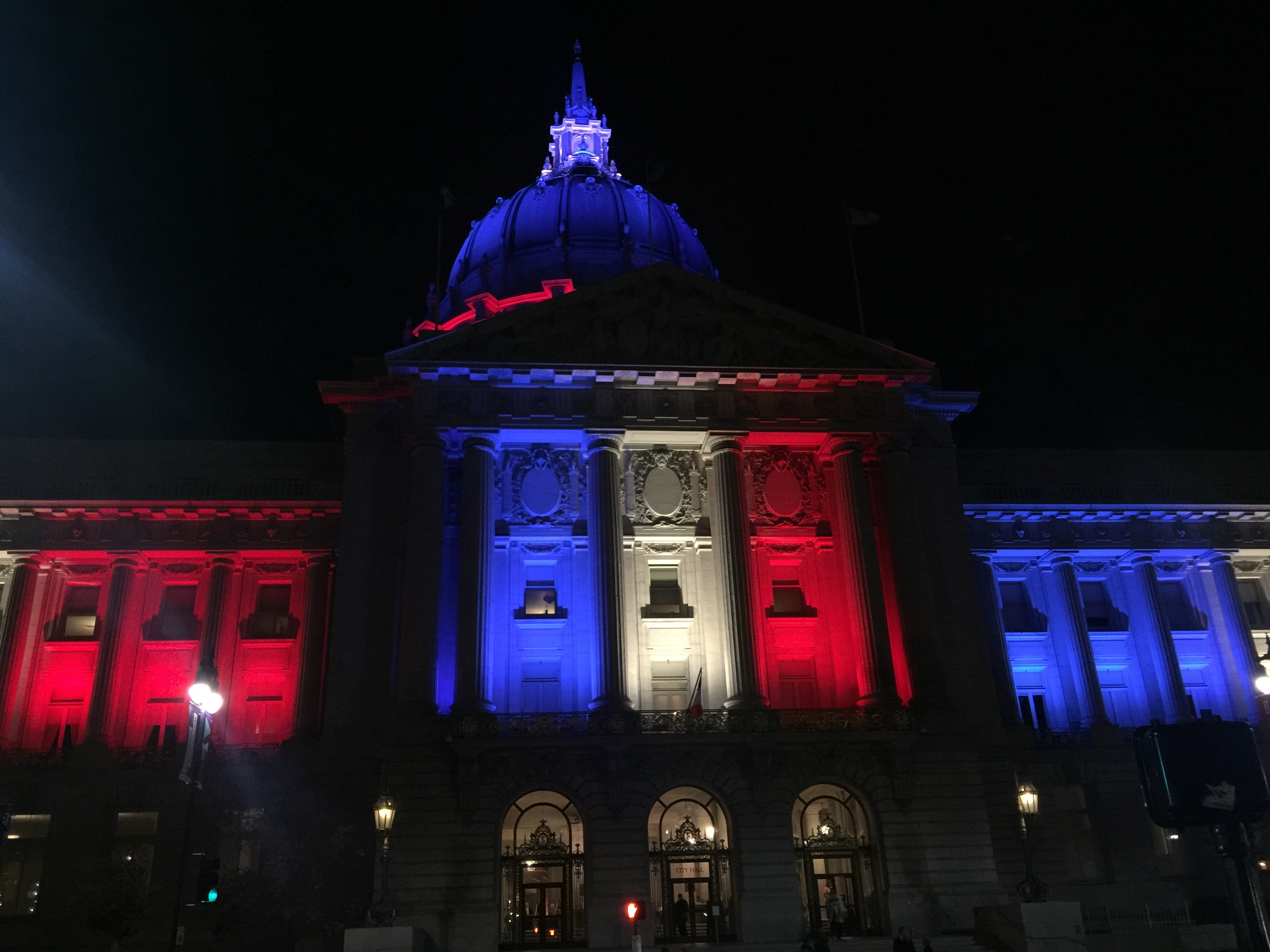
San Francisco City Hall, U.S.

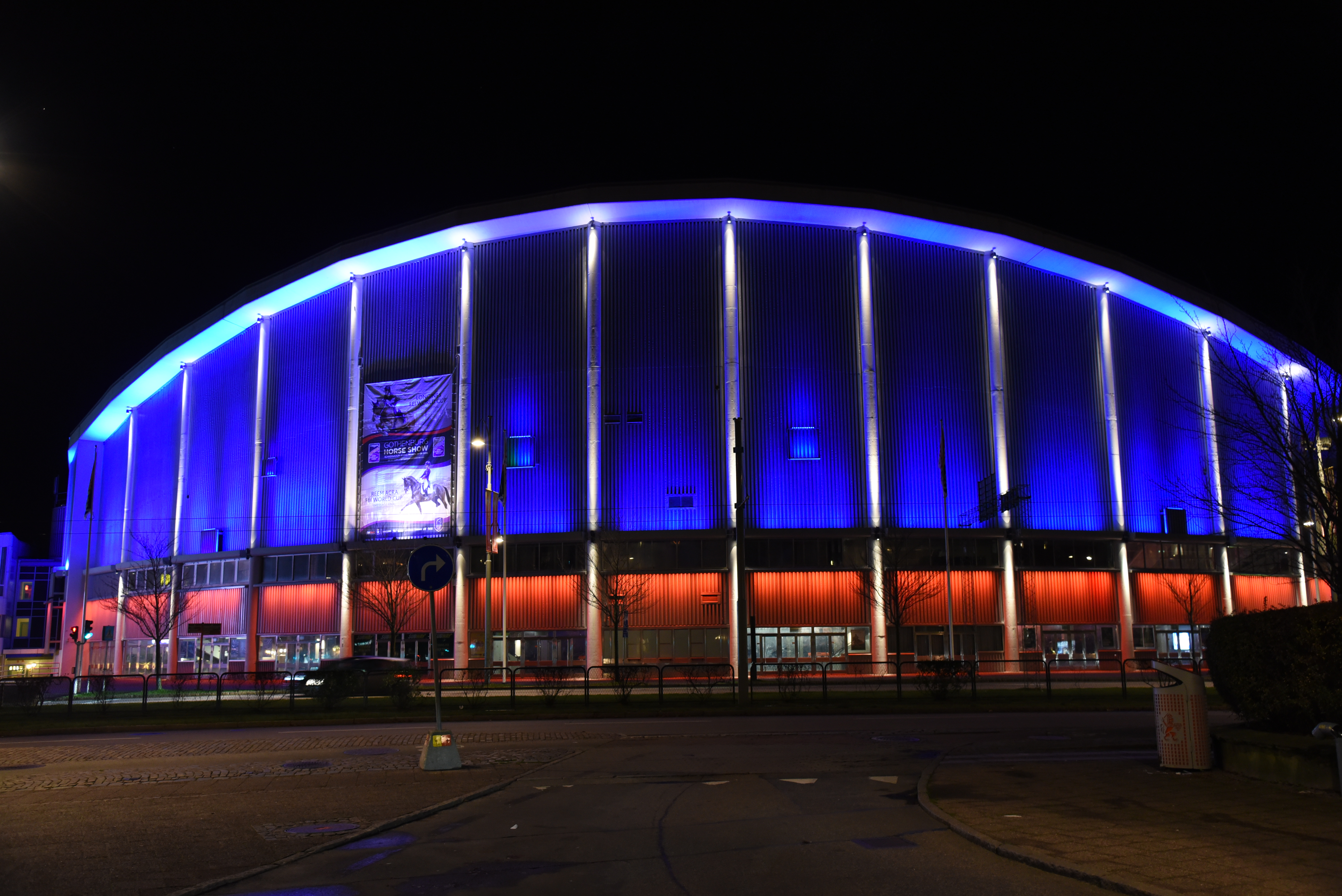
Scandinavium, Gothenburg, Sweden

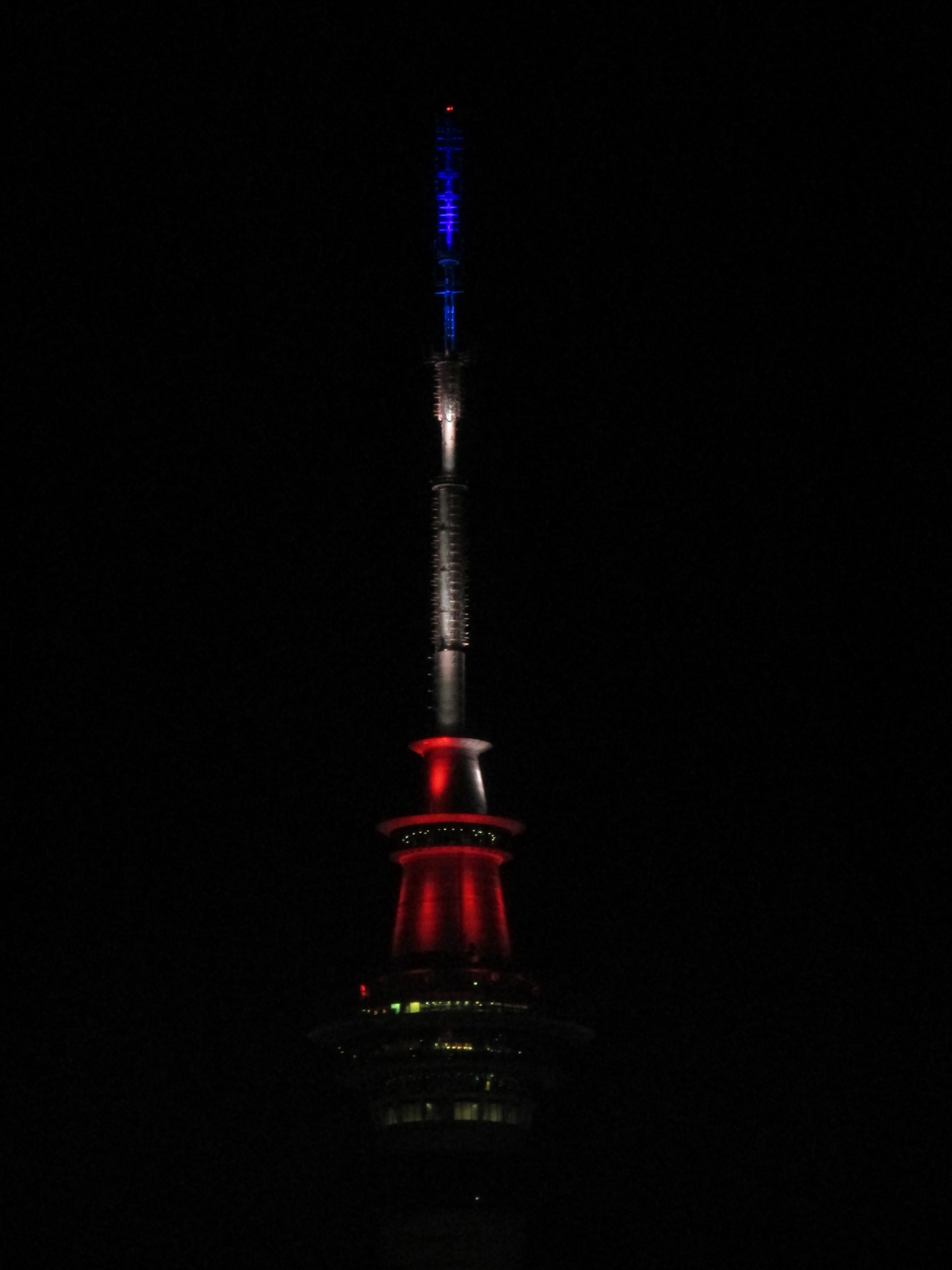
Sky Tower, Auckland, New Zealand

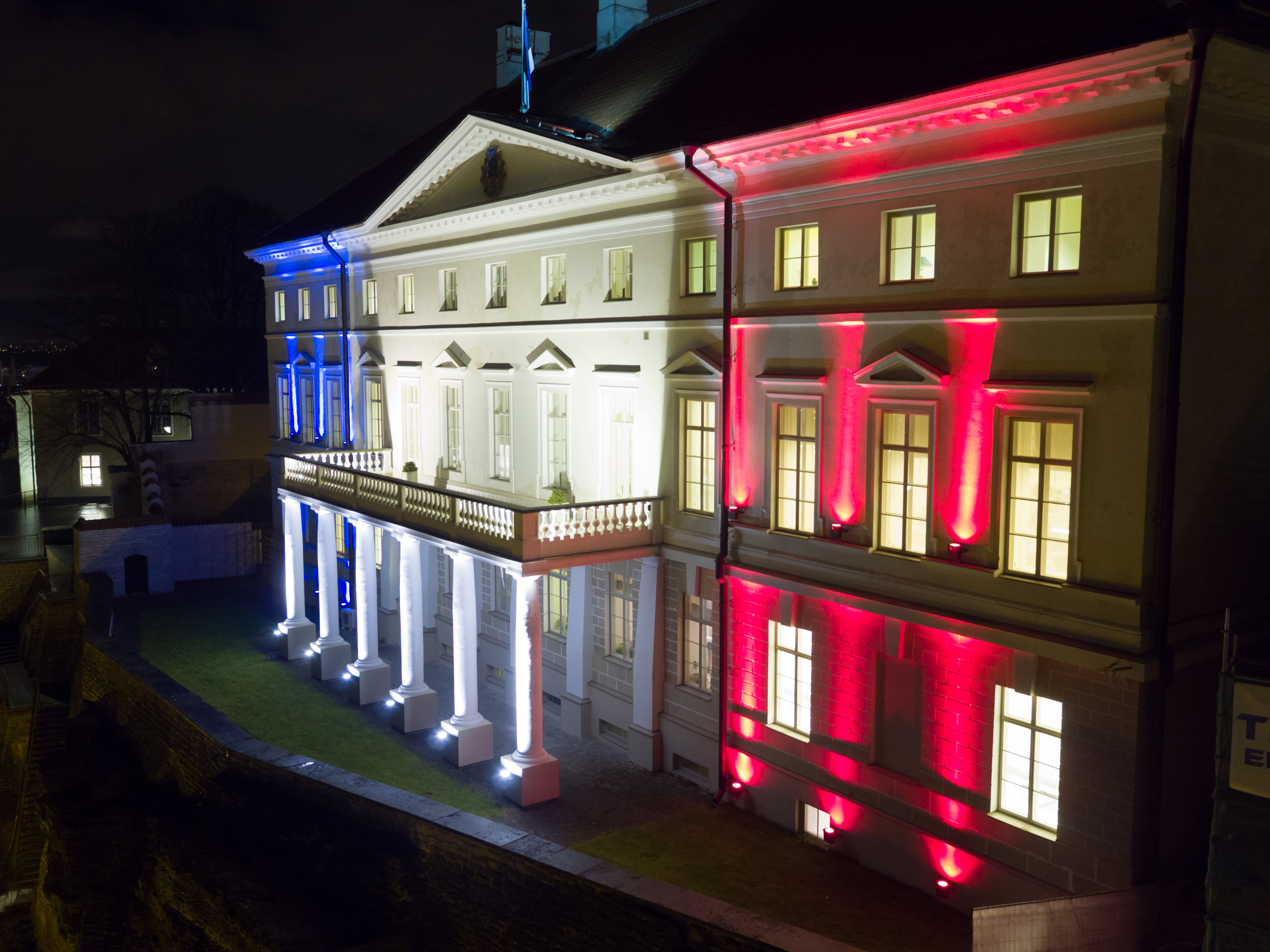
Stenbock House, Tallinn, Estonia

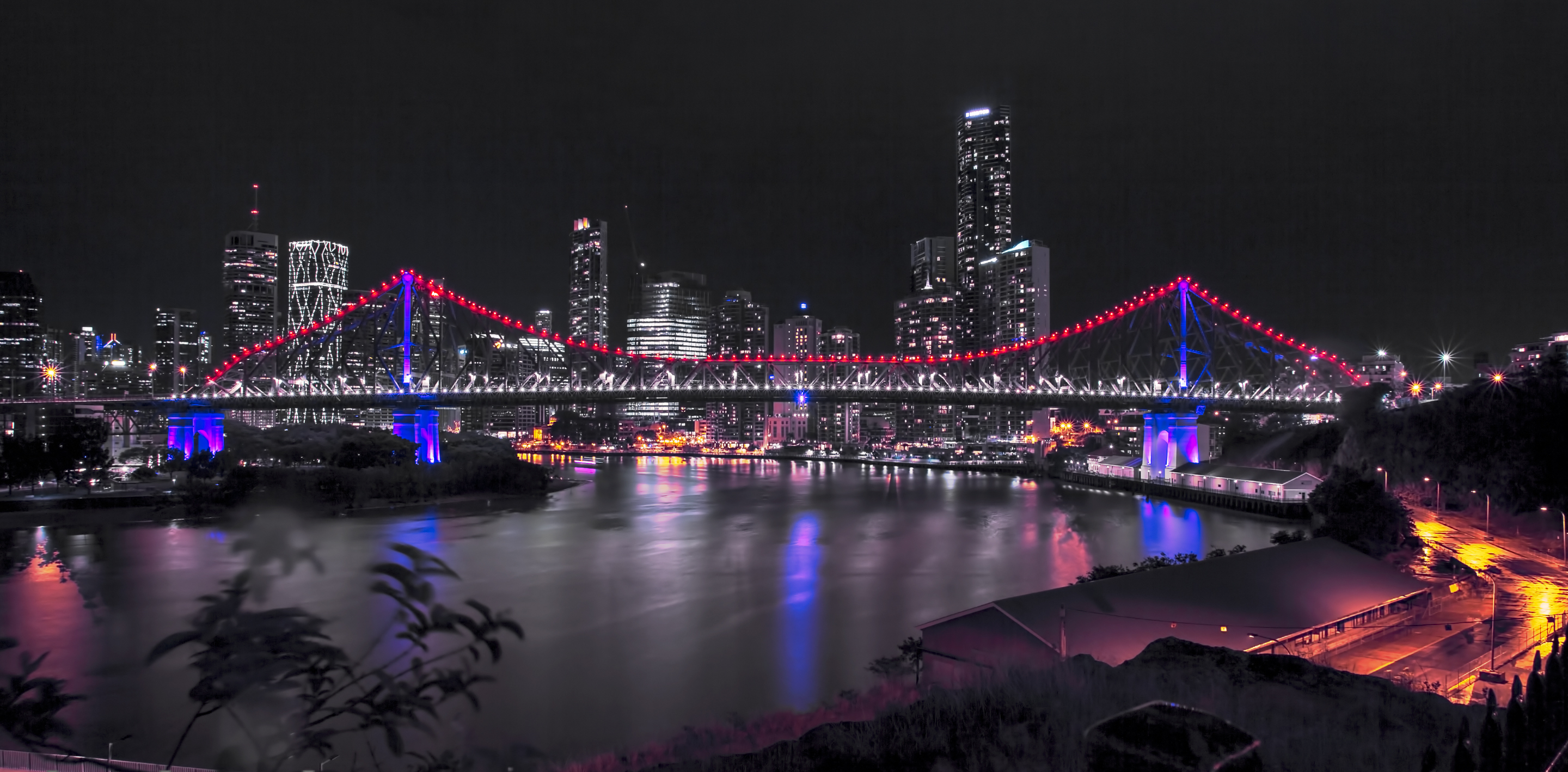
Story Bridge, Brisbane, Australia

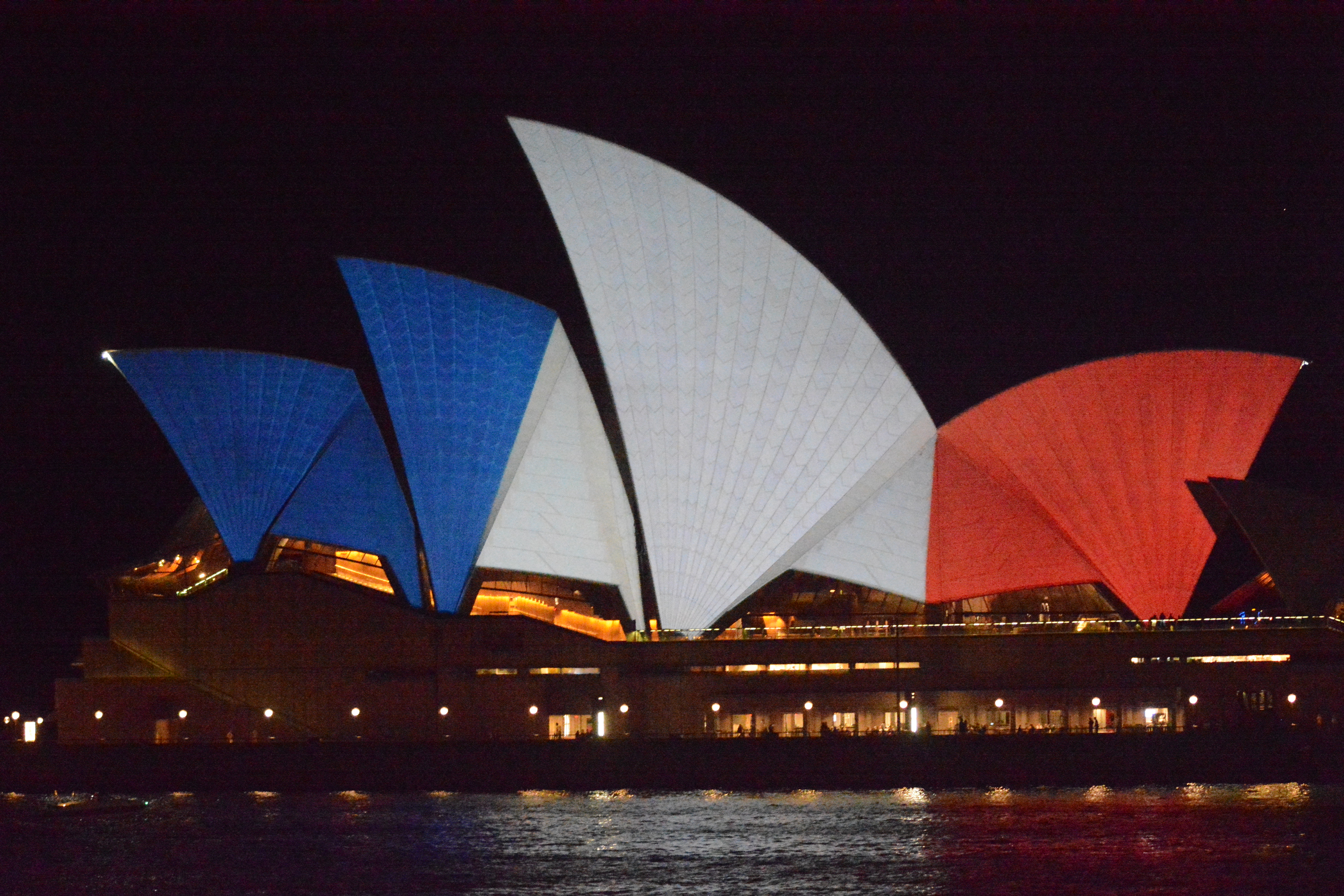
Sydney Opera House, Australia

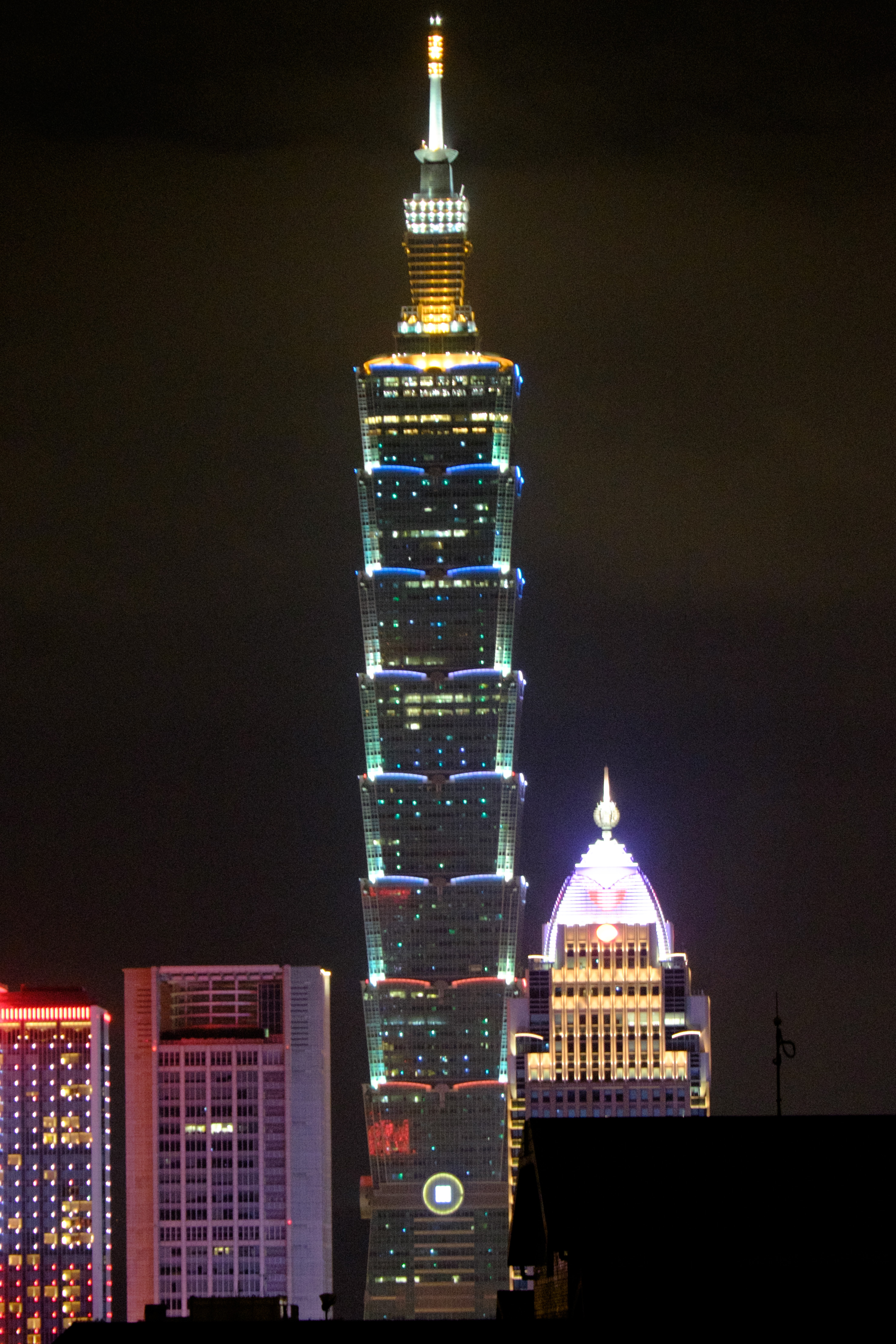
Taipei 101, Taiwan

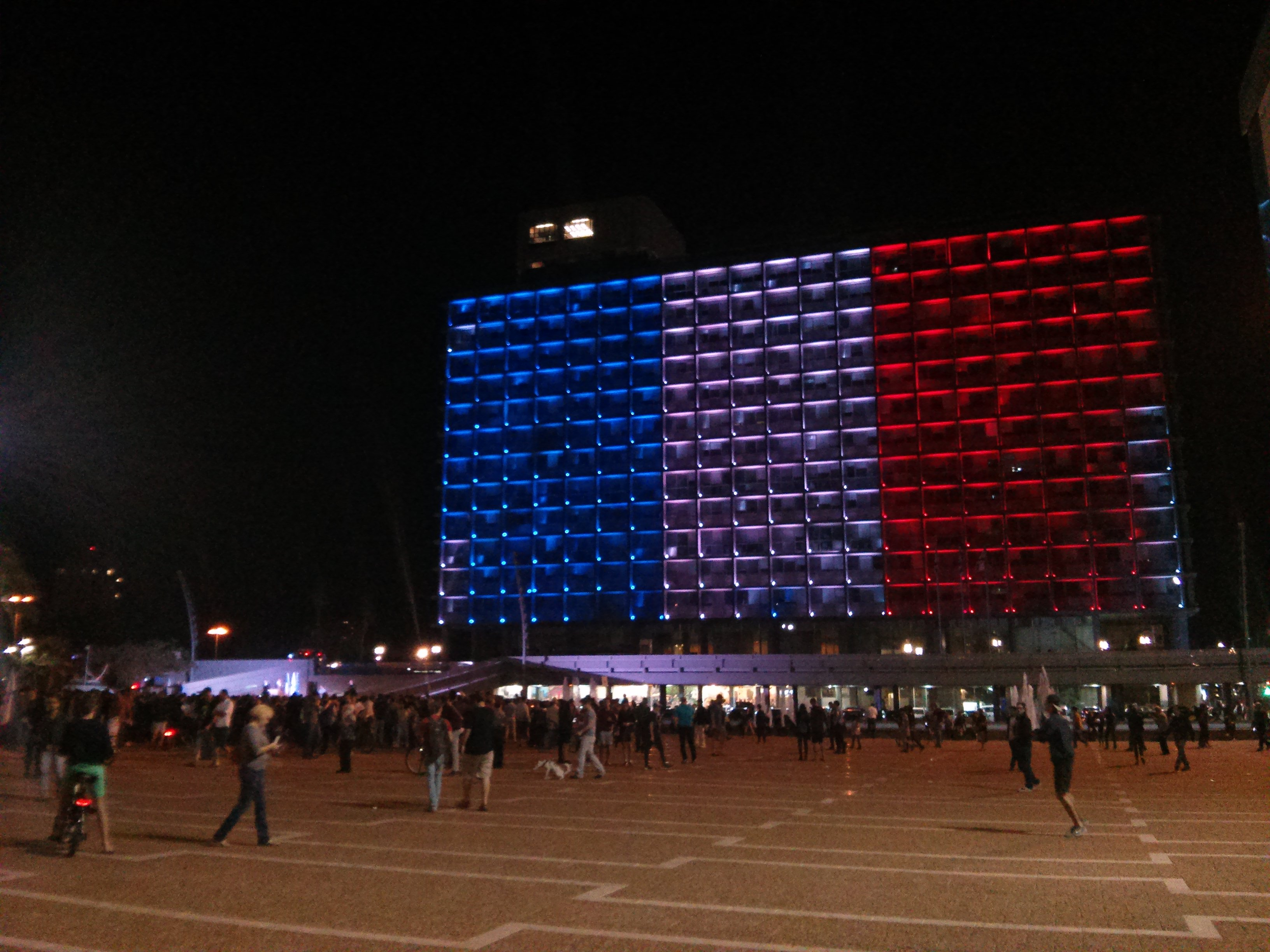
Tel Aviv City Hall, Israel

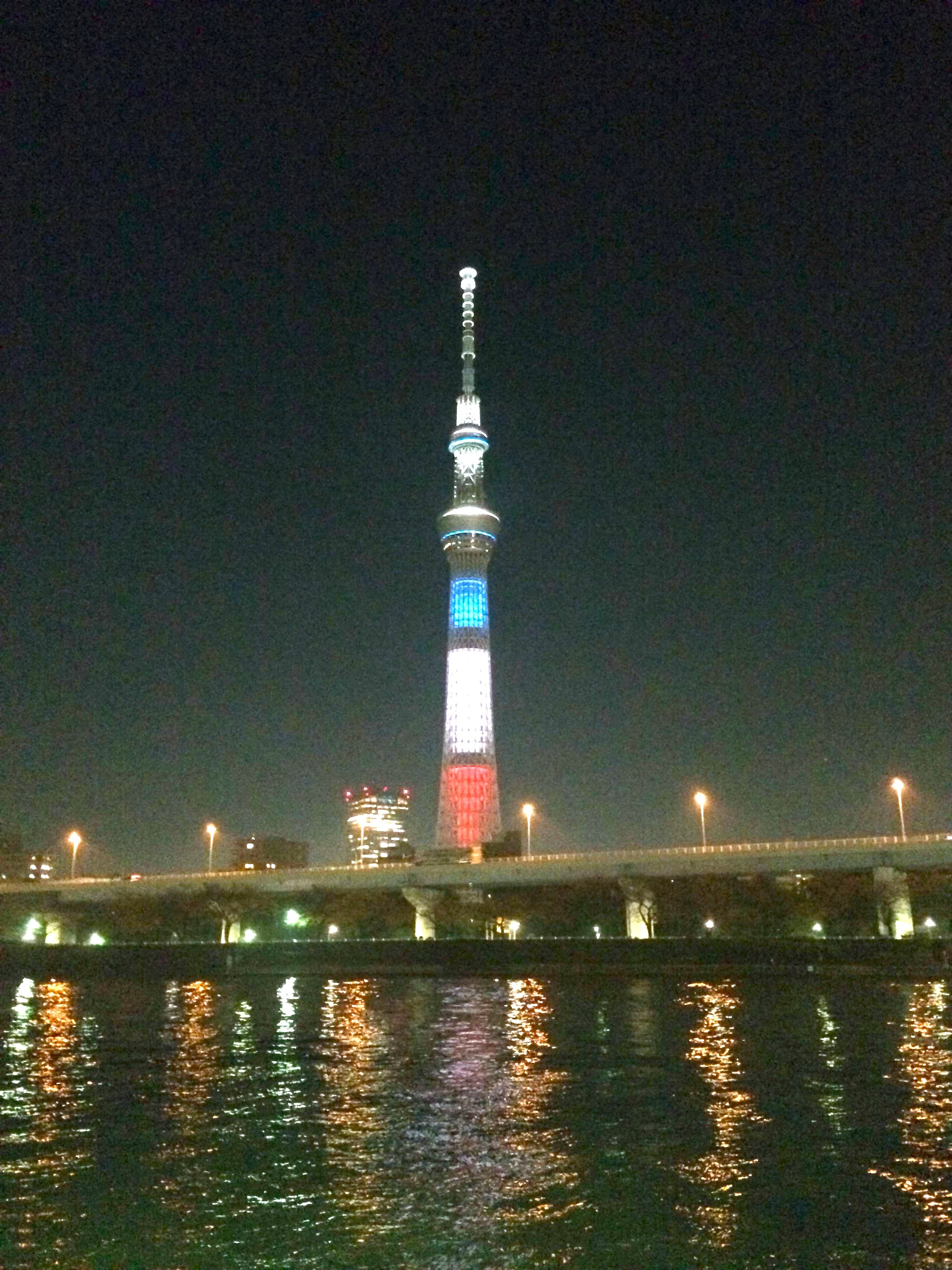
Tokyo Skytree, Japan

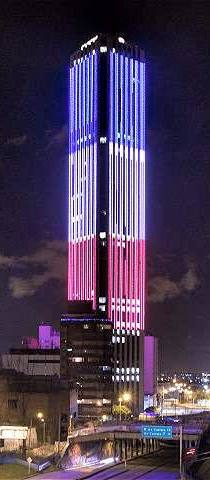
Torre Colpatria, Bogotá, Colombia

== Popular reactions ==
=== Vigils and memorials ===
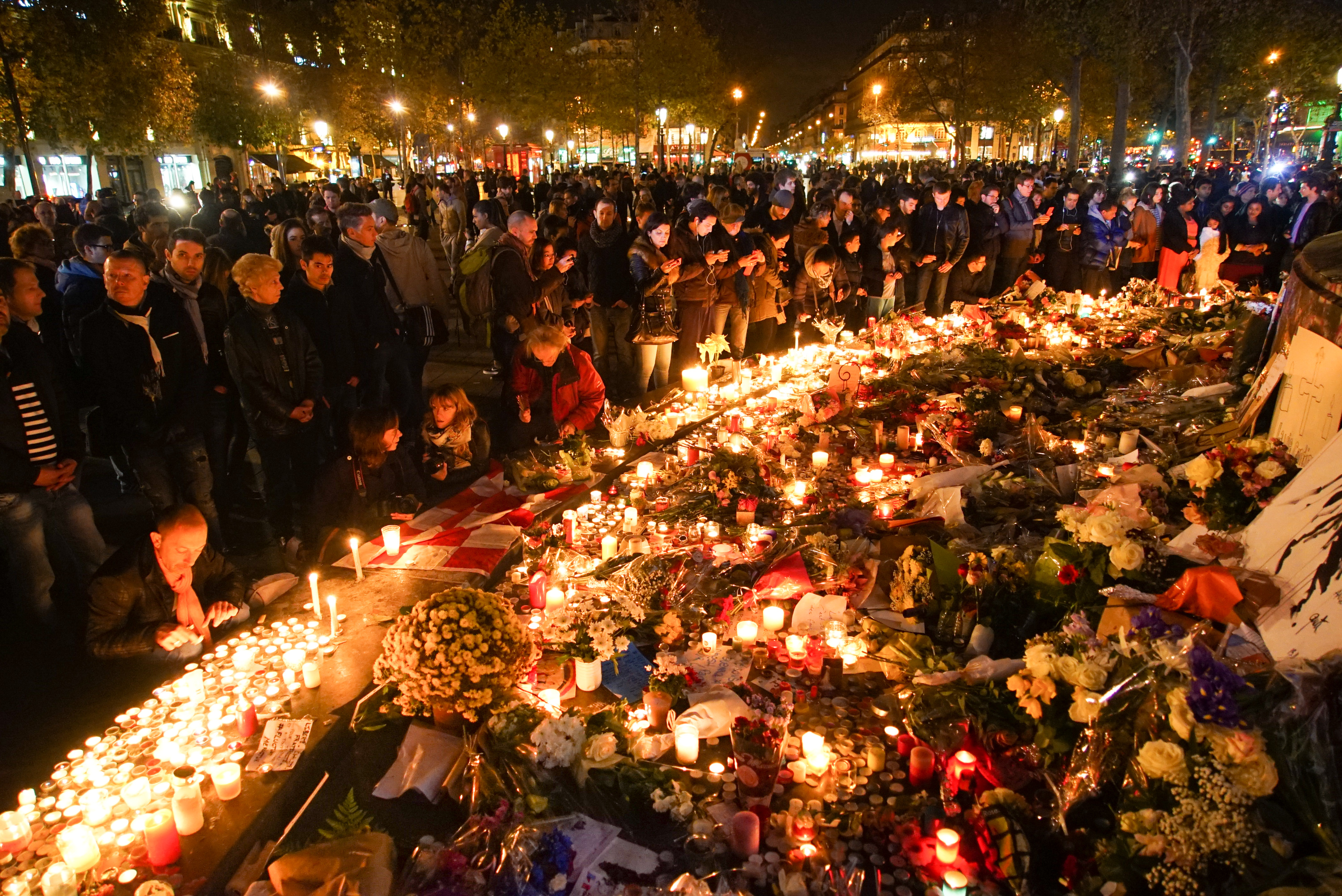
Civil service in remembrance of the attacks victims at the Place de la République in Paris on 15 November 2015

French foreign exchange students gathered in Union Square in New York City where they lit candles and sang "La Marseillaise". Vigils took place in Sydney, Montreal, London, New York City, Glasgow, and Manila among others.

On 14 November, German pianist Davide Martello towed his grand piano by bike to the Bataclan theatre, where a reported 80 people had died in the attack. There, he played John Lennon's "Imagine" to a crowd gathered outside in tribute to the victims. Martello is known for travelling around conflict zones to play the piano and previously performed at the sites of the Charlie Hebdo attacks.

At the 800th annual Lord Mayor's Show in London, a two-minute silence was held with flags at half-mast while fireworks were cancelled. At the City Hall of Athens, the flags of France, Greece, and the European Union were at half-mast to mourn for the victims. The Christmas decorations of Athens have been left unlit.

The European Union declared 13 November a European Day of Mourning and member states held a minute's silence on 16 November at 12 p.m. Central European Time to show a sign of respect and solidarity to those who lost their lives in the attacks. In the UK, all public places and many government offices and officials were to have both UK and French flags flown at half mast as a sign of respect.

On 17 November, England played France at Wembley Stadium, London with fans of both teams uniting to sing the French national anthem, "La Marseillaise", before a minute's silence. On the first weekend of English Premier League matches since the attack, "La Marseillaise" was played before every game. French football club Paris Saint-Germain was granted permission to wear the message 'Je suis Paris' on the team's jersey for two matches.

A number of residents of the Syrian city of Damascus, caught in fierce fighting between the Syrian government, ISIS and Western air strikes wrote an open letter stating, "We extend our hands to all the people that love peace and freedom, most of all the French people."

=== Social media ===
"Peace for Paris"

In the hours after the attack, some Parisians used social media, in particular the Twitter hashtag #PorteOuverte (French for "#OpenDoor"), to offer overnight shelter to strangers stranded by the attacks. The hashtag trended worldwide. A modified version of the International Peace Symbol by London-based French graphic designer Jean Jullien, in which the centre fork was modified to resemble the Eiffel Tower, was also widely spread. The symbol was widely shared with the hashtags #PeaceForParis, #PrayForParis, #PrayForFrance and #JeSuisParis. Facebook reintroduced its safety check-in system so users in Paris could notify friends and family that they were safe. Facebook also encouraged users to temporarily overlay a transparent image of the French flag to "support France and the people of Paris".

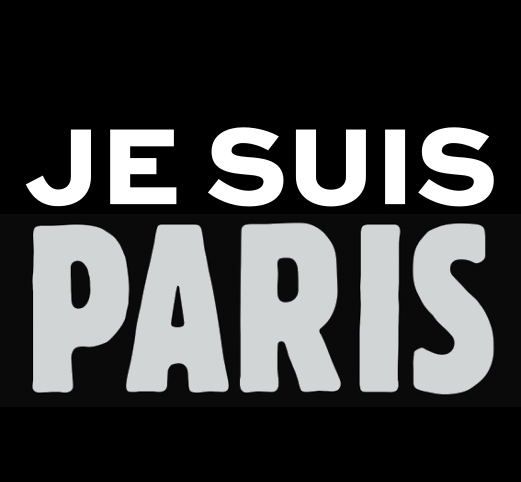
"Je suis Paris", a remake of the "Je suis Charlie" slogan

In the wake of the attack, phrases such as "Je Suis Paris" and "We are all Parisians" appeared on news broadcasts and social media websites worldwide to show solidarity with the victims. This was similar to the reactions after the January 2015 Charlie Hebdo shooting with the phrase "Je Suis Charlie" and reflects the historic phrases ich bin ein Berliner in the 1961 Berlin crisis and the phrase "Tonight, we are all Americans" spoken on air by France 2 reporter Nicole Bacharan after the September 11 attacks. The French embassies and institutions used the hashtag #NousSommesUnis (French We are united).

The slogan #PrayforParis has been object to critical discussion due to its religious and imperative character. The Dalai Lama said "Humans created this problem and humans must solve it". The French Artist Joann Sfar suggested to use the hashtag #ParisIsAboutLife instead.

Some ISIL supporters used the hashtag #باريس_تشتعل (Paris burns, Paris is burning or Paris is on fire), the same hashtag that appeared in the January 2015 attacks on Charlie Hebdo's office and a Paris grocery store. In response, social media users urged saturation with #Parisburns, re-purposing the hashtag as support for the victims and Paris. Muslims also rebuked the attacks by using the hashtag #NotInMyName and #MuslimsAreNotTerrorist, the former of which had been utilized by Muslims in the past to condemn ISIS actions.

Following the attack, a Facebook campaign was created with the goal of getting Eagles of Death Metal's cover of the Duran Duran song "Save a Prayer" to number one on the UK Singles Chart. The song ultimately peaked at number 53 for the chart dated the week after the attack.

Google attached a black ribbon to the bottom of their page "in memory of the victims of the Paris attacks". Skype and other websites have allowed users to make free calls to France to allow users to connect and communicate with loved ones or relatives/friends to ensure their safety.

=== Other reactions ===
NBC's Saturday Night Live opted not to open the show with a comedic cold open as it usually does; instead, cast member Cecily Strong addressed the City of Paris in English on behalf of New York City, which was followed by a French translation of her comments. After saying the show's opening line, SNL returned to its usual format. The show has only removed its usual cold open after five other occasions—the September 11 attacks in 2001, the Sandy Hook shooting in 2012, Donald Trump's victory in the 2016 United States presidential election, the Las Vegas shooting in 2017, and the 2022 Russian invasion of Ukraine.

In the days following the attacks, the French news and entertainment show Le Petit Journal sent its reporters on to the streets of Paris to document the public's reactions. Their reporter Martin Weill recorded an interview with a six-year-old boy named Brandon, who, when asked if he understood why the attackers had done what they had done, responded: "Yes, because they're really, really mean. Bad guys are not very nice. And we have to be really careful because we have to change houses." Videos of the interview went viral in both the French- and English-speaking world.

The hacktivist group Anonymous declared "war" on ISIL in its largest operation to date, and by the second day claimed to have taken down 3,824 pro-ISIL Twitter accounts and doxxed multiple recruiters.

The National Football League has implemented metal detectors and increased security inside and outside its stadiums for the games that played during week 10 of the 2015 season as spectators were discouraged from bringing non-plastic clear bags into the venues. All teams that played held a moment of silence to honor the victims of the attacks.

The WWE has changed its security guidelines and held a moment of Silence prior to the 16 November episode of Monday Night Raw displaying the French Flag and the Eiffel Tower in the form of Peace for Paris.

=== Negative reactions ===
At a football match against Greece, some Turkish supporters booed during a minute of silence in commemoration of the attacks, and a section reportedly shouted "Allahu akhbar," an incident echoing what had previously happened during a minute of silence for the victims of the October Ankara bombings, in which minority Alevis and Kurds made up the majority of the Ankara bombing victims. During a moment of silence in a match between Moldova and Azerbaijan, Azerbaijani soccer fans booed.

== Responses from Muslim groups ==
Various Muslim religious leaders and organisations from around the world condemned the attacks. Some took to social media to say that the attacks went against the teachings of Islam. Saudi Arabia, the UAE, Kuwait, Qatar and Egypt have been among the Arab states leading condemnations of the simultaneous attacks in Paris, in addition to Morocco, Bahrain, Iraq, Turkey, and Iran. Al-Azhar university in Cairo, the Muslim world's top theological institution of learning and oldest university, strongly condemned the attack, saying, "The time has come for the world to unite to confront this monster... Such acts are contrary to all religious, humanitarian and civilized principles." Mirza Masroor Ahmad, the head of the Ahmadiyya Muslim Community, issued a press release from London condemning the attack by expressing his heartfelt sympathies and condolences to the French nation, and said that these attacks are against the teachings of the Quran. Les Fédérations Musulmanes, a French Muslim federation, strongly condemned the attacks in Paris denouncing it as "abject barbarism." The Luxembourg Shoura, a federation of Muslim leaders in Luxembourg condemned the attacks in a statement released on the Tuesday following the attacks saying "We are outraged and express loud and clear our deep disgust and our unequivocal condemnation of these criminal acts committed against civilians done at random."

The Muslim Council of Britain described the attacks as "horrific and abhorrent" and participated in one of the Trafalgar Square vigils. The Council added that "There is nothing Islamic about such people and their actions are evil, and outside the boundaries set by our faith ...there is no justification for such carnage whatsoever." The Association of British Muslims said that "The Muslim faith condemns such acts of violence" and "The attacks in Paris were not aimed just at France or Paris, they are attacks against the values and freedoms we cherish and live by in Europe, they were aimed at all of us."

The Syrian branch of Al-Qaeda, al-Nusra Front, praised the attacks, saying that even though they view ISIL as "dogs of hellfire", they applaud when "infidels" get attacked by ISIL.

In a press release by the Australian National Imams Council, the Grand Mufti of Australia Ibrahim Abu Mohamed made some controversial remarks that: "These recent incidents highlight the fact that current strategies to deal with the threat of terrorism are not working. It is therefore imperative that all causative factors such as racism, Islamophobia, curtailing freedoms through securitisation, duplicitous foreign policies and military intervention must be comprehensively addressed". He received criticism from politicians and the press for not directly condemning the Paris attacks. Which led to a further statement: "We wish to emphasise it is incorrect to imply that the reference to causative factors provides justification for these acts of terrorism." and "Dr. Ibrahim Abu Mohamed have consistently and unequivocally condemned all forms of terrorist violence."

== Political reactions ==
The attacks called attention to existing controversy over mass surveillance and calls for prohibition of strong encryption or otherwise hard-to-monitor communications. Shortly after the reports it was reported that a PlayStation 4 unit had been found in the home of one of the suspects, which correlated with Belgian home affairs minister Jan Jambon's statement three days before the attack that "The most difficult communication between these terrorists is via PlayStation 4". Though not encrypted, PlayStation chats allow millions of customers to speak with people they would not otherwise know, complicating the traffic analysis that can expose patterns even in encrypted communications when the participants in a conversation are identified. Comments after the attack by American CIA Director John Brennan blamed disclosures by Edward Snowden and availability of encryption for aiding terrorist networks, though this idea was opposed in a New York Times editorial as "a new and disgraceful low".

At the second political debate in the 2016 U.S. Democratic presidential primary, when Bernie Sanders was asked whether after the attacks he still believed that the greatest threat to national security was climate change, he explained that climate change was related to rising terrorism, because it caused competition over resources.

== See also ==
- Anti-terrorism legislation
- Je suis Charlie
- ISIL-related terror attacks in France
- Law on the fight against terrorism
- List of Islamist terrorist attacks
- Terrorism in France
- War on terror
