= Je suis Charlie =

Slogan in response to a 7 January 2015 shooting

The standard layout, as copied from the Charlie Hebdo site

The front cover of edition of 14 January 2015, with a cartoon in the same style as 3 November 2011 cover, uses the phrase "Je suis Charlie".

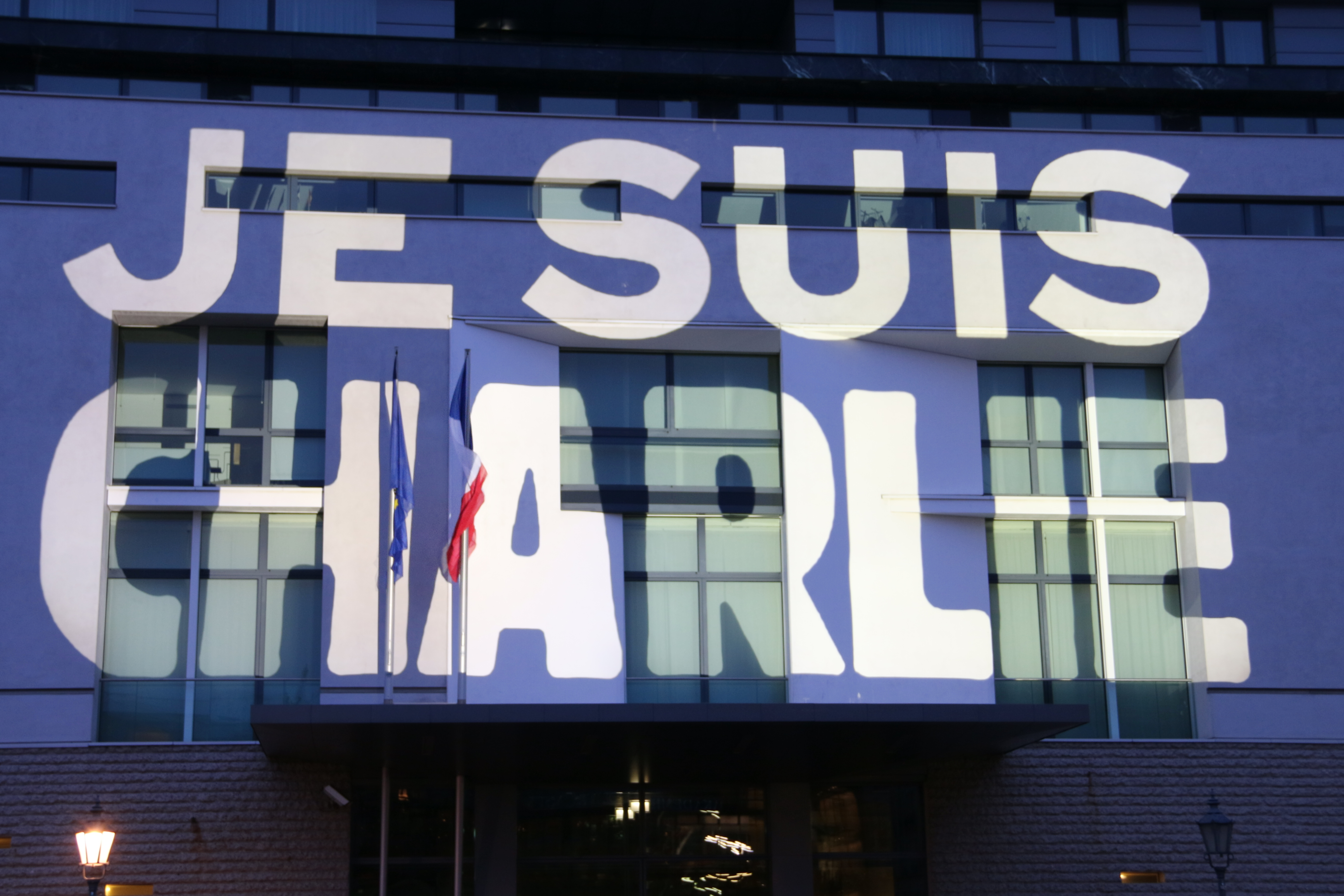
Slogan projected on the French embassy in Berlin

"Je suis Charlie" (French for 'I am Charlie'; French pronunciation: [ʒə sɥi ʃaʁli]) is a slogan and logo created by French art director Joachim Roncin and adopted by supporters of freedom of speech and freedom of the press after the 7 January 2015 shooting in which twelve people were killed at the offices of the French satirical weekly newspaper Charlie Hebdo. It identifies a speaker or supporter with those who were killed at the Charlie Hebdo shooting, and by extension, a supporter of freedom of speech and resistance to armed threats. Some journalists embraced the expression as a rallying cry for the freedom of self-expression.

The slogan was first used on Twitter. The website of Charlie Hebdo went offline shortly after the shooting and when it became live again, it bore the legend Je suis Charlie on a black background, a PDF containing translations in seven languages was added shortly thereafter. The statement was used as the hashtag #jesuischarlie and #iamcharlie on Twitter, as computer printed or hand-made placards and stickers, and displayed on mobile phones at vigils, and on many websites, particularly media sites.

Within two days of the attack, the slogan had become one of the most popular news hashtags in Twitter history. Je suis Charlie was adopted worldwide, was used in music, displayed in print and animated cartoons (including The Simpsons), and became the new name of a town square in France. On 12 January, Charlie Hebdo revealed the cover of its 14 January issue, set to be published a week after the attacks began. The cover features a cartoon of the Islamic prophet Muhammad shedding a tear while holding a Je suis Charlie sign, below the words "Tout est pardonné" ("All is forgiven").

== Origin and meaning ==
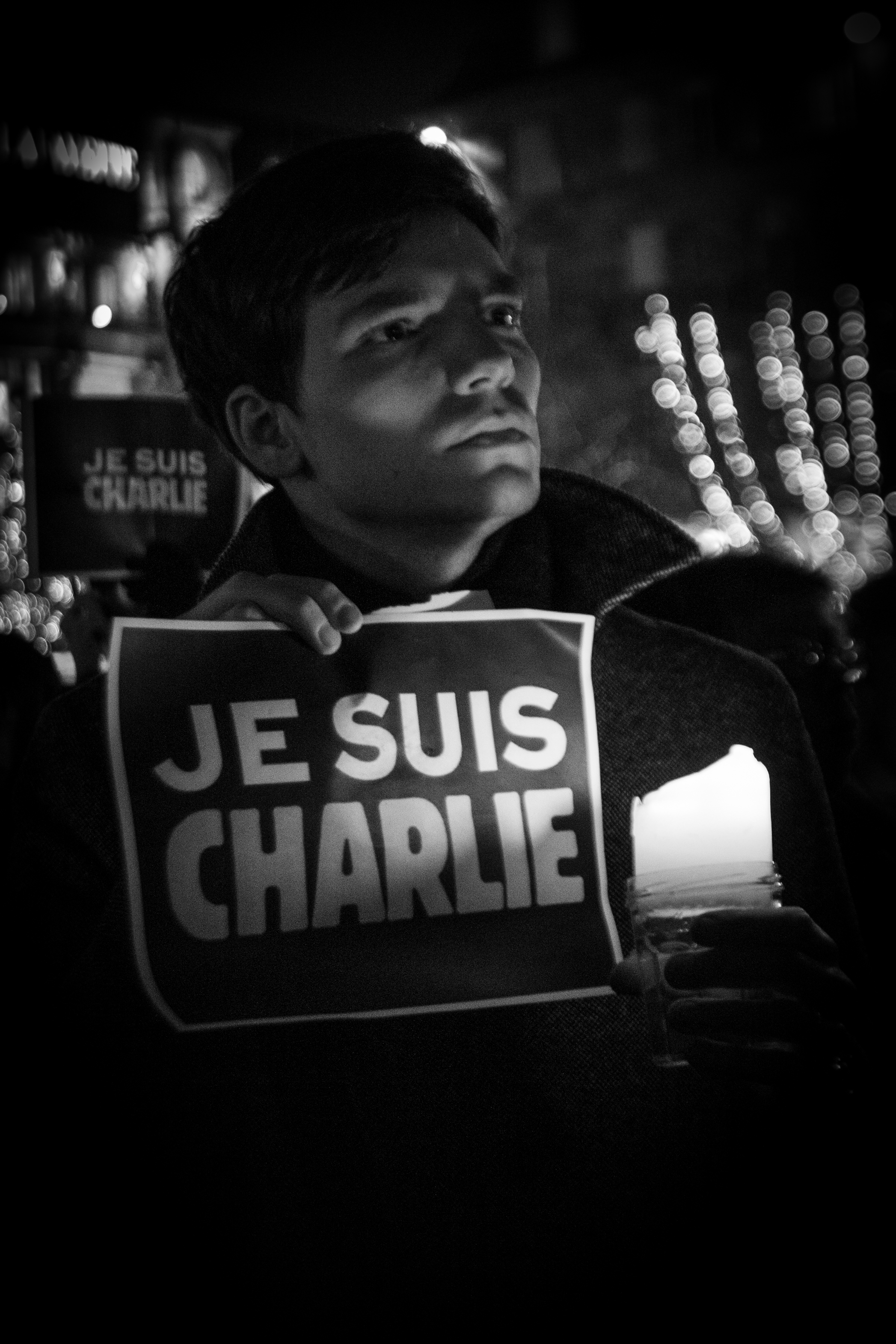
7 January 2015 in Strasbourg

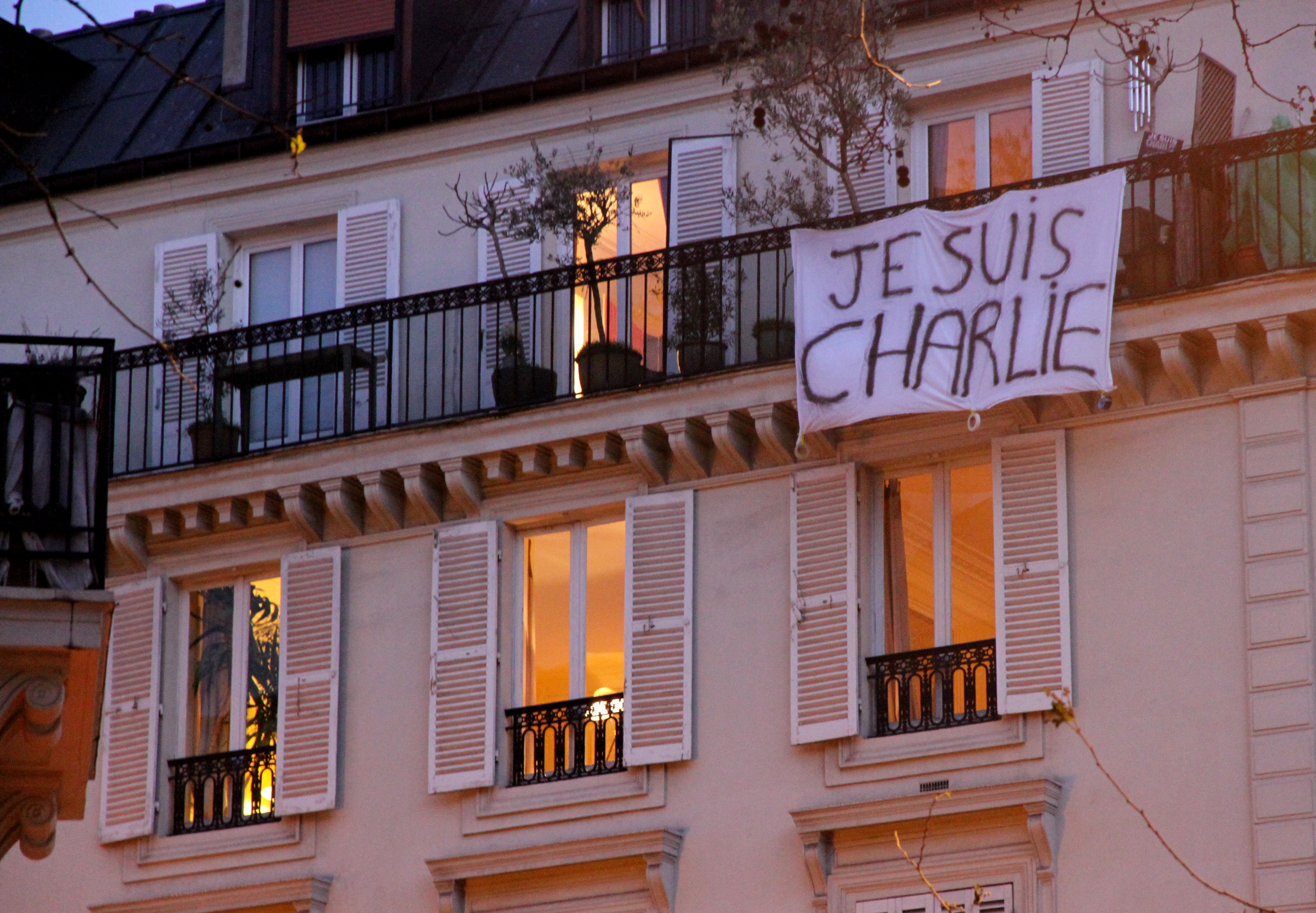
11 January 2015 in Paris

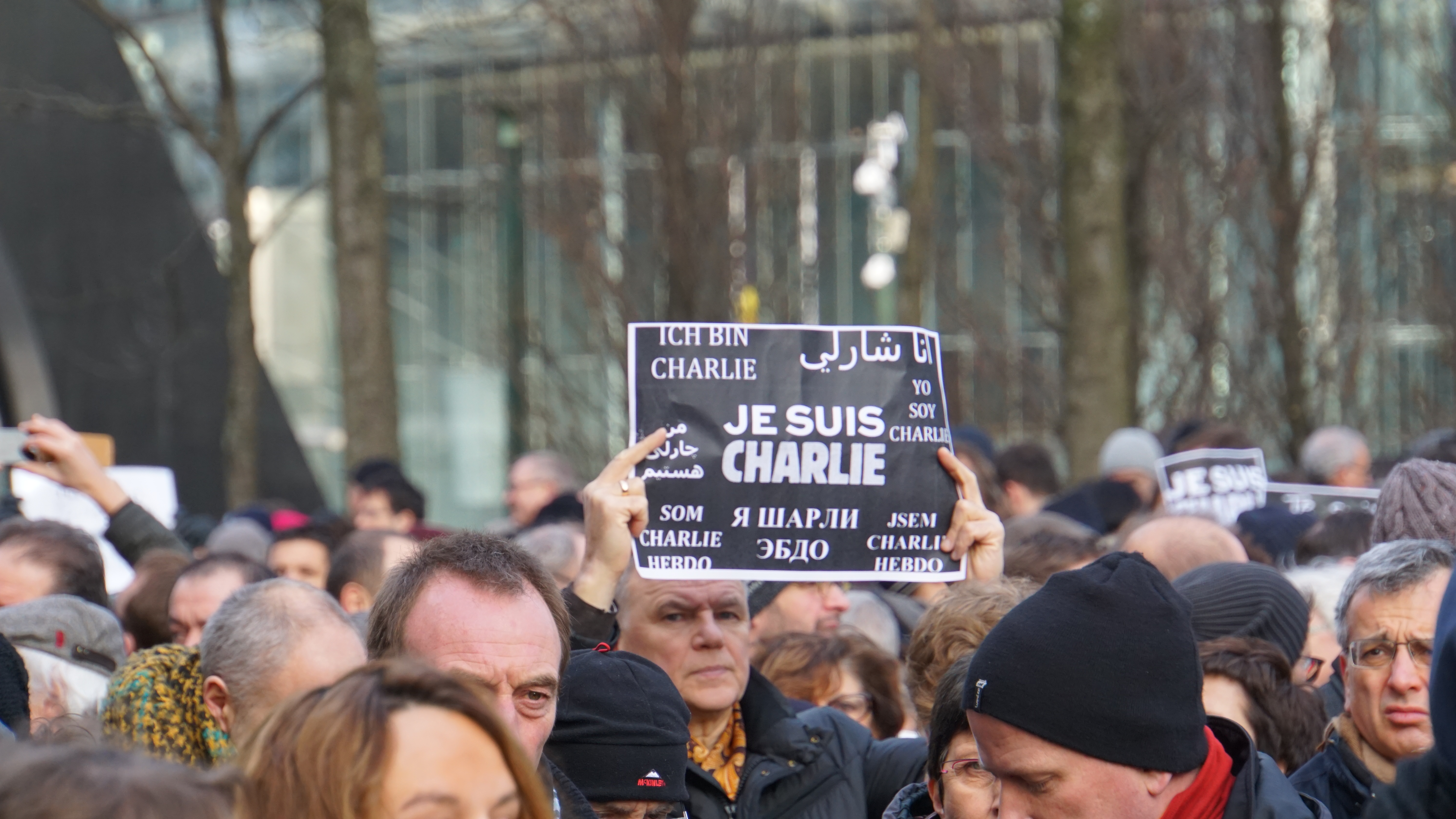
"Je suis Charlie" in many languages in Brussels, 11 January 2015

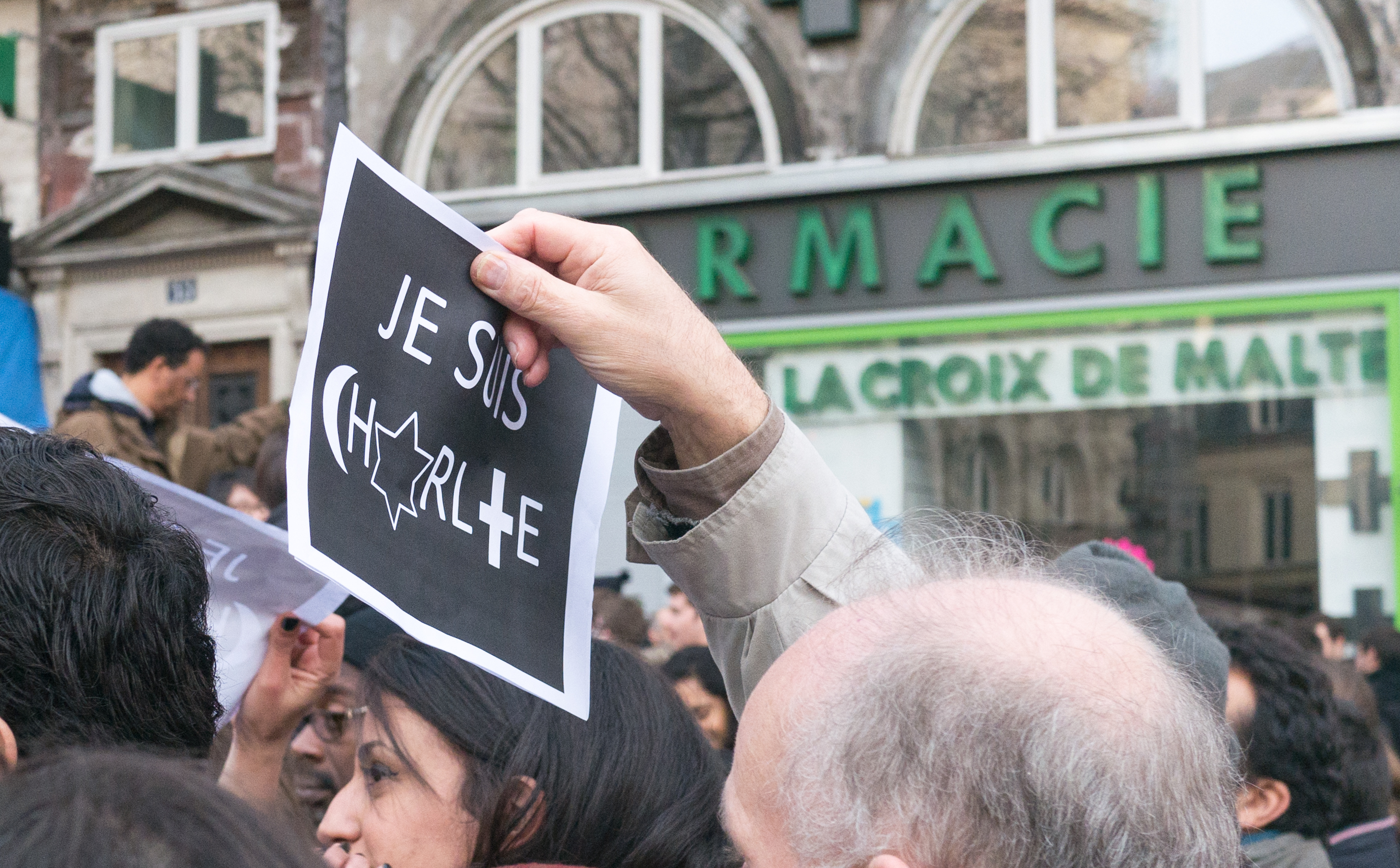
With symbols of the three main Abrahamic religions

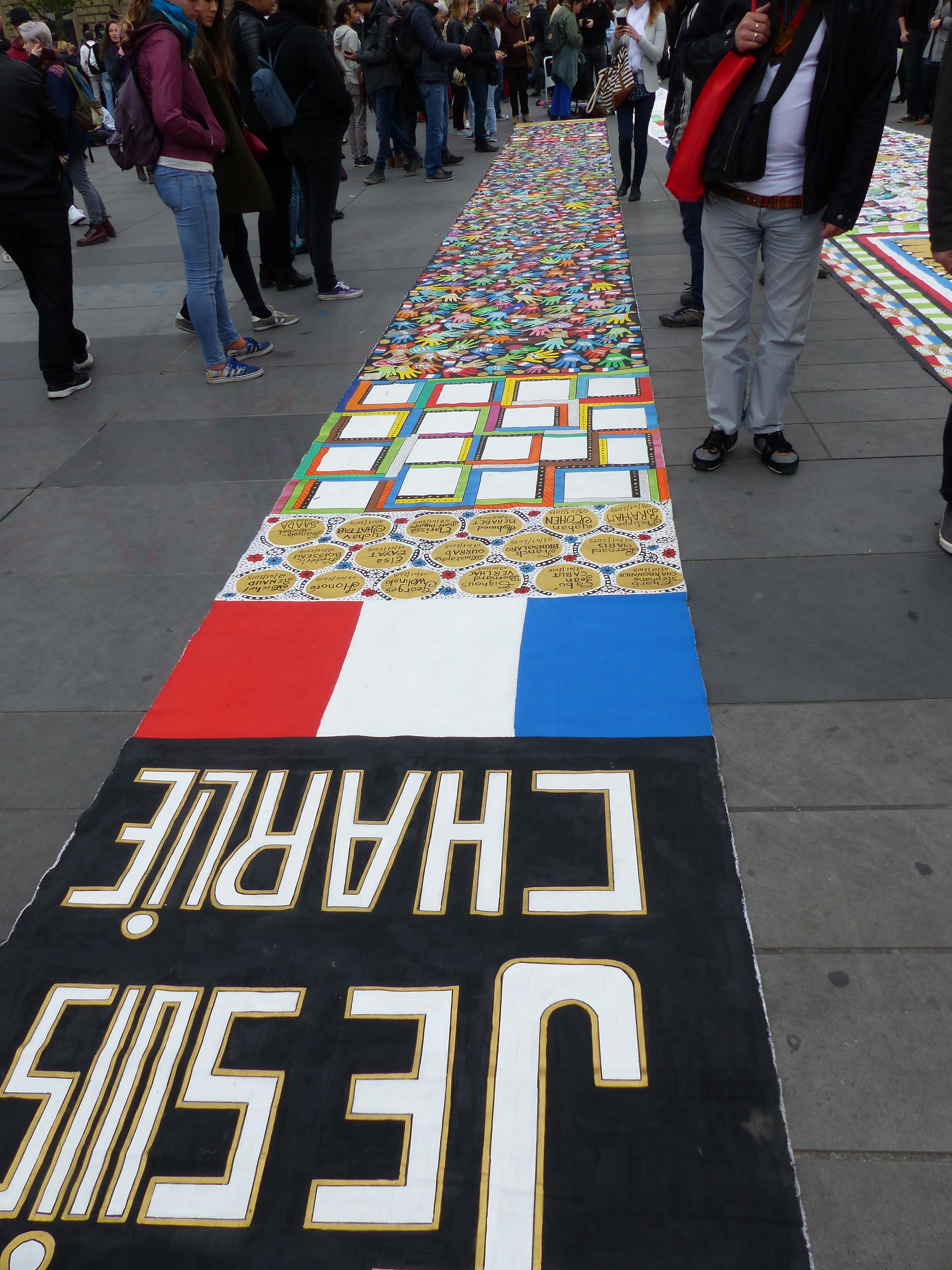
Place de la République, Paris

About one hour after the attack, an image of the slogan was posted to Twitter by Joachim Roncin, a French artist and music journalist for Stylist magazine. Roncin says he created the image because he lacked words. Roncin said the phrase came to him naturally, because he regularly spends time with his son looking at Où est Charlie? books (the French language version of Where's Wally?).

The slogan is intended to evoke solidarity with the victims, as other similar phrases have done. Such "I am" and "We are" slogans "express sympathy, outrage, and horror by subsuming ourselves into victims' identities", wrote Amanda Hess of Slate. French media in particular noted its similarity to the phrase "Tonight, we are all Americans," ("Ce soir, nous sommes tous Américains") spoken on air by France 2 reporter Nicole Bacharan on the evening of 11 September 2001. The phrase was widely embraced, including being printed on the front page of French newspaper Le Monde the following day. Je suis Charlie has also been compared to another phrase of solidarity, "Ich bin ein Berliner" ("I am a Berliner"), a declaration by U.S. President John F. Kennedy on 26 June 1963, in West Berlin on the 15th anniversary of the Berlin blockade.

Media also have drawn comparisons to the iconic "I'm Spartacus" scene in the film Spartacus (1960).

=== Reaction to violence against journalists ===
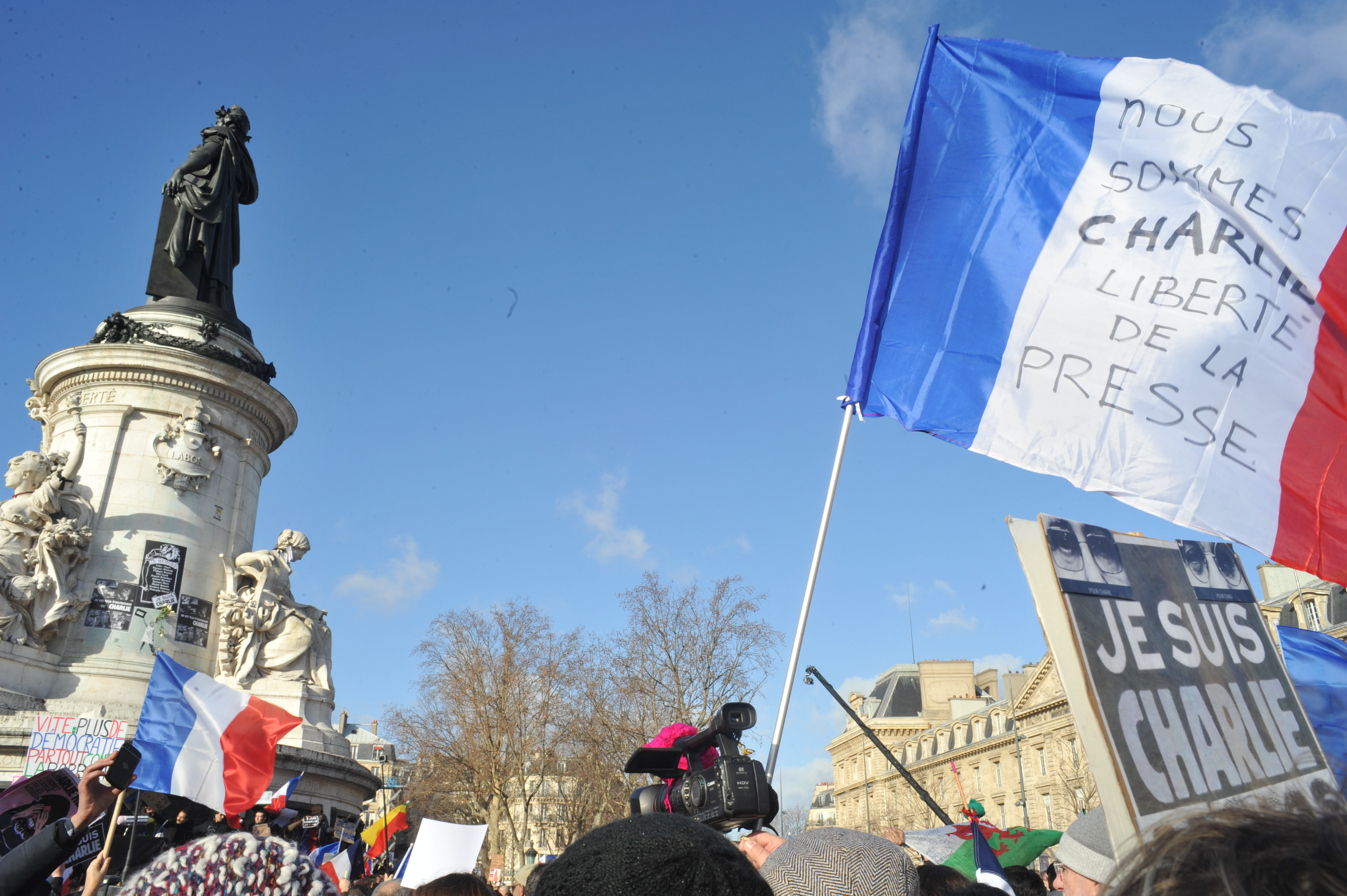
With "Liberté de la Presse" (Freedom of the press) in Paris on 11 January 2015

Beyond expressing sympathy for the victims, within hours of the attack the hashtag was used by journalists discussing the issue of censorship and threats. Sophie Kleeman of Mic wrote, "#JeSuisCharlie sends a clear message: Regardless of the threat of hatred or violence, journalists and non-journalists alike refuse to be silenced. As Charbonnier said in 2012, following the firebombing of his offices, 'I have neither a wife nor children, not even a dog. But I'm not going to hide.'"

In the opinion of Gene Policinski, chief operating officer of the Newseum Institute and Senior Vice-President of the First Amendment Center, the Charlie Hebdo killings were part of a string of recent threats toward journalists and freedom of speech, following North Korea's threats over the release of the film The Interview (2014) and ISIL's executions of journalists. In his opinion, Policinski stated that instead of being successful at silencing anyone, these attempts at censorship and the Paris massacre have backfired and instead brought more awareness and support to freedom of speech. "Ironically, such violence directed at journalists, authors and others is recognition that free expression and the marketplace of ideas—enshrined in the U.S. [Constitution] in the First Amendment—is a powerful weapon against tyranny", he wrote; "For more than 220 years, in the U.S., the 45 words of the First Amendment have defined the nation's core freedoms of religion, speech, press, assembly and petition. We now have another few words that will serve as a global means of declaring those freedoms: #JeSuisCharlie."

Journalist Peter Bella wrote that more than 100 reporters were killed "doing their jobs" in 2014 and that "many were executed just because they were journalists." He said the hashtag "was created to support Charlie Hebdo, the victims, and freedom of the press, speech, and expression. I am Charlie. You are Charlie. We are all Charlie."

=== "Je ne suis pas Charlie" ===
Counter-hashtags also appeared as expressions of disagreement with the unconditional support of Charlie Hebdo. The hashtag #JeNeSuisPasCharlie ("I am not Charlie") was used by those who accuse the magazine of racism. Le Monde reported that a fake bomb was left in the faculty lounge of a French high school containing the message: "Je ne suis pas Charlie". In an article titled "I Am Not Charlie Hebdo" published in The New York Times, American journalist David Brooks, while describing the journalists at Charlie Hebdo as "martyrs on behalf of freedom of expression," described Charlie Hebdo as a puerile magazine whose offensive humor would be labelled as hate speech in the United States. News media also used the slogan "Je ne suis pas Charlie" to discuss why they chose not to publish any Charlie Hebdo cartoons as part of their news reporting. Others used the "Je ne suis pas Charlie" slogan to make a comparison between the loud outcry over the attacks in Paris, and the comparatively smaller outcry over other atrocities going on in non-Western countries that took place at the same time.

=== Other criticism ===
In a The New Yorker essay, Teju Cole objected to the claim that Charlie Hebdo cartoonists and writers were equal opportunity offenders; to him, the magazine, in recent years, had taken a turn "specifically for racist and Islamophobic provocations (...) featuring hook-nosed Arabs, bullet-ridden Korans, variations on the theme of sodomy, and mockery of the victims of a massacre". Furthermore, he also posited that the outpouring of support for Charlie Hebdo was only possible because the attack fits in a pre-established narrative wherein Western lives are worth more, and which sees that violence that befalls the Third World and/or has Western allies as accomplices is paid comparatively little attention. Cole also rebuked the view that "violence by self-proclaimed Jihadists is the only threat to liberty in Western societies", stating that the very governments of France, the US, and the UK undermine free speech within their own societies via monitoring and punishment of dissidents and critics of the state. Cole was among the writers who boycotted the PEN American Center's May 2015 gala as an award to Charlie Hebdo was due to be presented at the ceremony.

Glenn Greenwald accused supporters of Je Suis Charlie of either keeping silence about, or downright supporting, what he sees as free speech violations perpetrated by the French state in the year that followed the massacre, including the following events: the arrest of comedian Dieudonné for hate speech, and of further dozens of people for "acts insulting religious faiths, or for cheering the men who carried out the attacks"; the criminal conviction, by France's highest court, of pro-Palestinian protesters for having advocated a boycott of Israeli products at a supermarket; the shutting down of mosques and coffee shops; and France's use of "emergency powers", after the November 2015 Paris attacks, to ban a rally by environmental activists in protest to the 2015 United Nations Climate Change Conference which was taking place in the French capital. He has accused most Je Suis Charlie supporters of being, not true advocates of free speech rights, but anti-Muslim agitators who used the massacre at the magazine's headquarters as a "cynical weapon". Greenwald has cited in his support the work of French sociologist Emmanuel Todd. Todd claims that the marches on 11 January 2015 to show solidarity with the Charlie Hebdo victims were not an expression of positive French values but of right-wing and anti-immigrant elements in France. The biggest of such protests, says Todd, "had occurred in the country's most historically Catholic and reactionary regions", with the working class and children of immigrants being notably absent therefrom. In 2015 Todd published a book expanding on his view named Qui est Charlie? Sociologie d'une crise religieuse ("Who is Charlie? Sociology of a religious crisis"), which has become his most controversial and popular essay.

== Usage ==
=== Twitter ===
Je suis Charlie trended at the top of Twitter hashtags on 7 January, the day of the attack. By the following afternoon it had appeared more than 3.4 million times, and was being used nearly 6,500 times per minute. By Friday, it had appeared more than 5 million times.

The U.S. Embassy in Paris and the Association française pour le nommage Internet en coopération were among the people and organizations which changed their Twitter profile pictures to the Je suis Charlie placard.

=== Cartoonists ===
Numerous cartoonists created art using the slogan. Others used it in combination with pictures of the deceased.

- The magazine Charlie Hebdo had used the name Charlie Brown from the Peanuts comic strip, and an image of Charlie Brown crying with the slogan was posted on Twitter.
- The Canberra Times political cartoonist David Pope released an image of a smoking gun, with a gunman saying, "He drew first."
- Cartoonist James MacLeod released an image of the power of the gun compared with the power of free speech.
- Soshy released an image of a blood-dripping Je suis Charlie in front of the French flag.
- Albert Uderzo, creator of Astérix, came out of retirement aged 87 following the attack. He released a new drawing of Astérix punching a villain wearing babouches while declaring "Moi aussi, je suis un Charlie!" ("I too am a Charlie!")
- Cartoonist Rob Tornoe used Je suis Charlie to mock newspapers and media companies, like the New York Daily News, for reprinting his cartoon without permission or payment.
- The Cagle Post posted a collection of Je suis Charlie cartoons from cartoonists in the United States and around the world.

=== Demonstrations ===
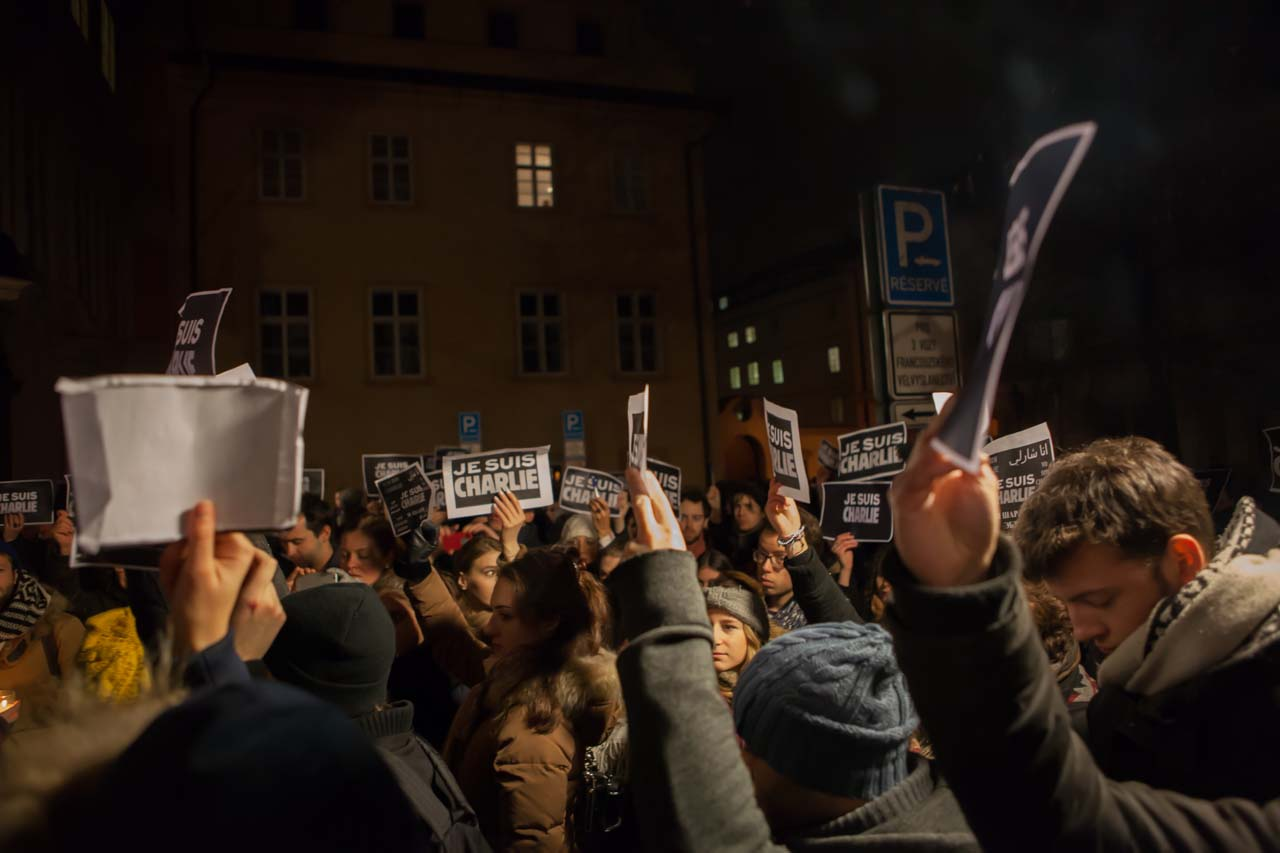
Prague, Czech Republic, 8 January 2015

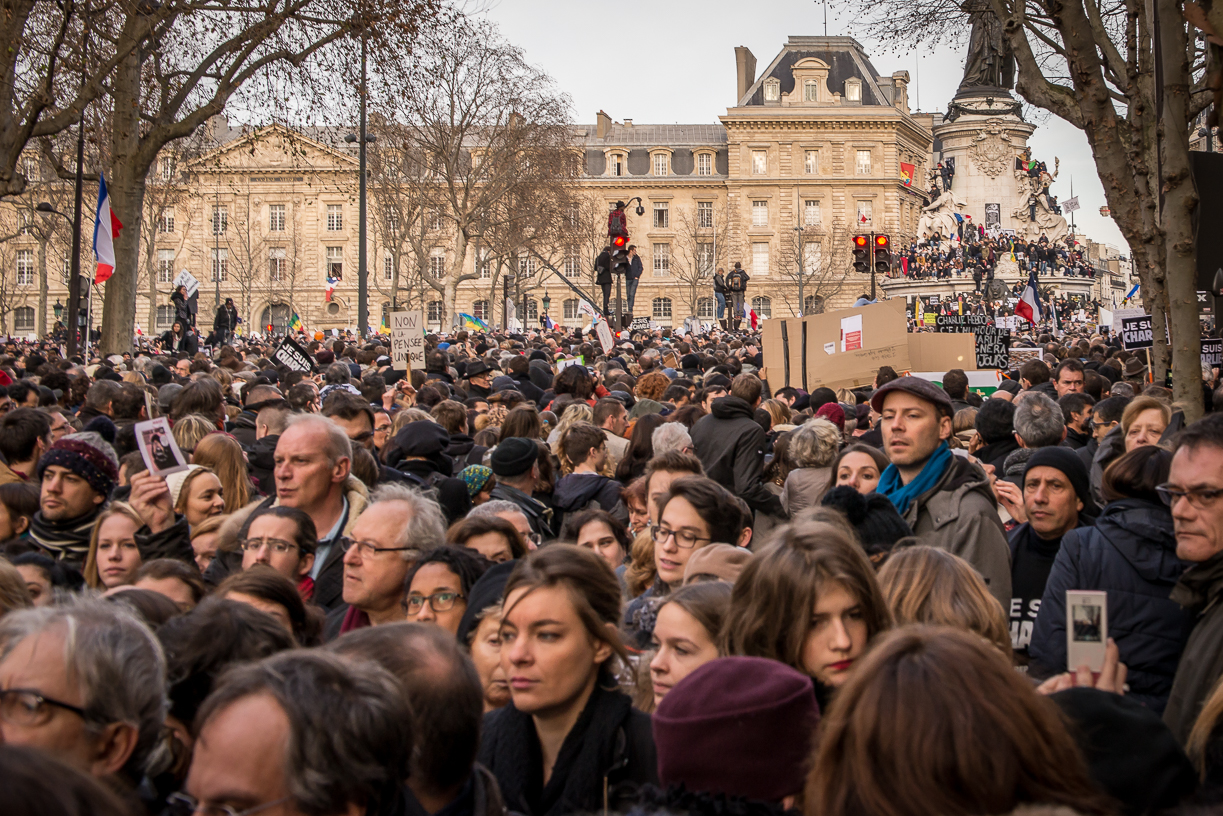
Paris, France, 11 January 2015

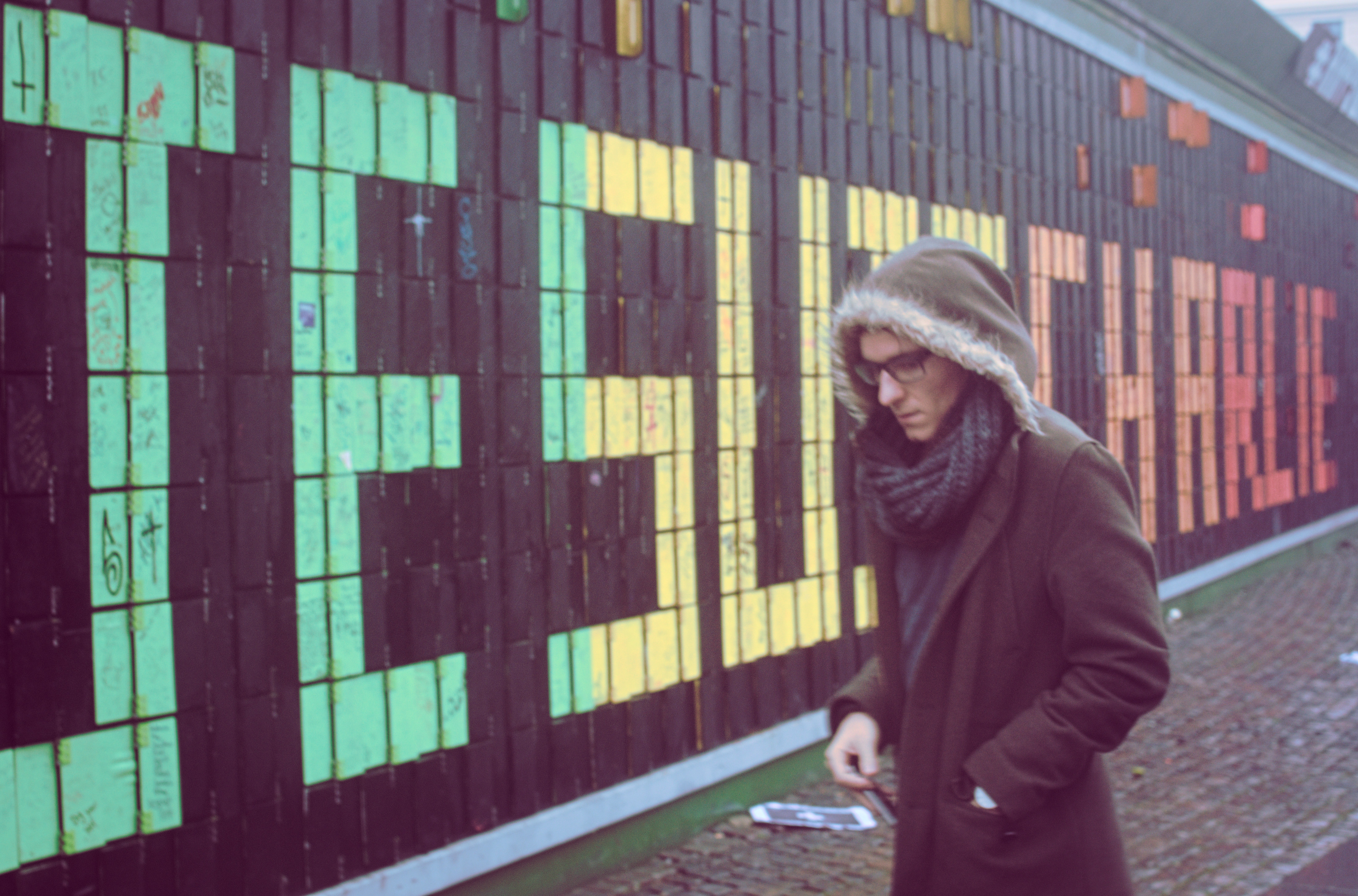
Tribute to Charlie Hebdo in Copenhagen, Denmark, 9 January 2015

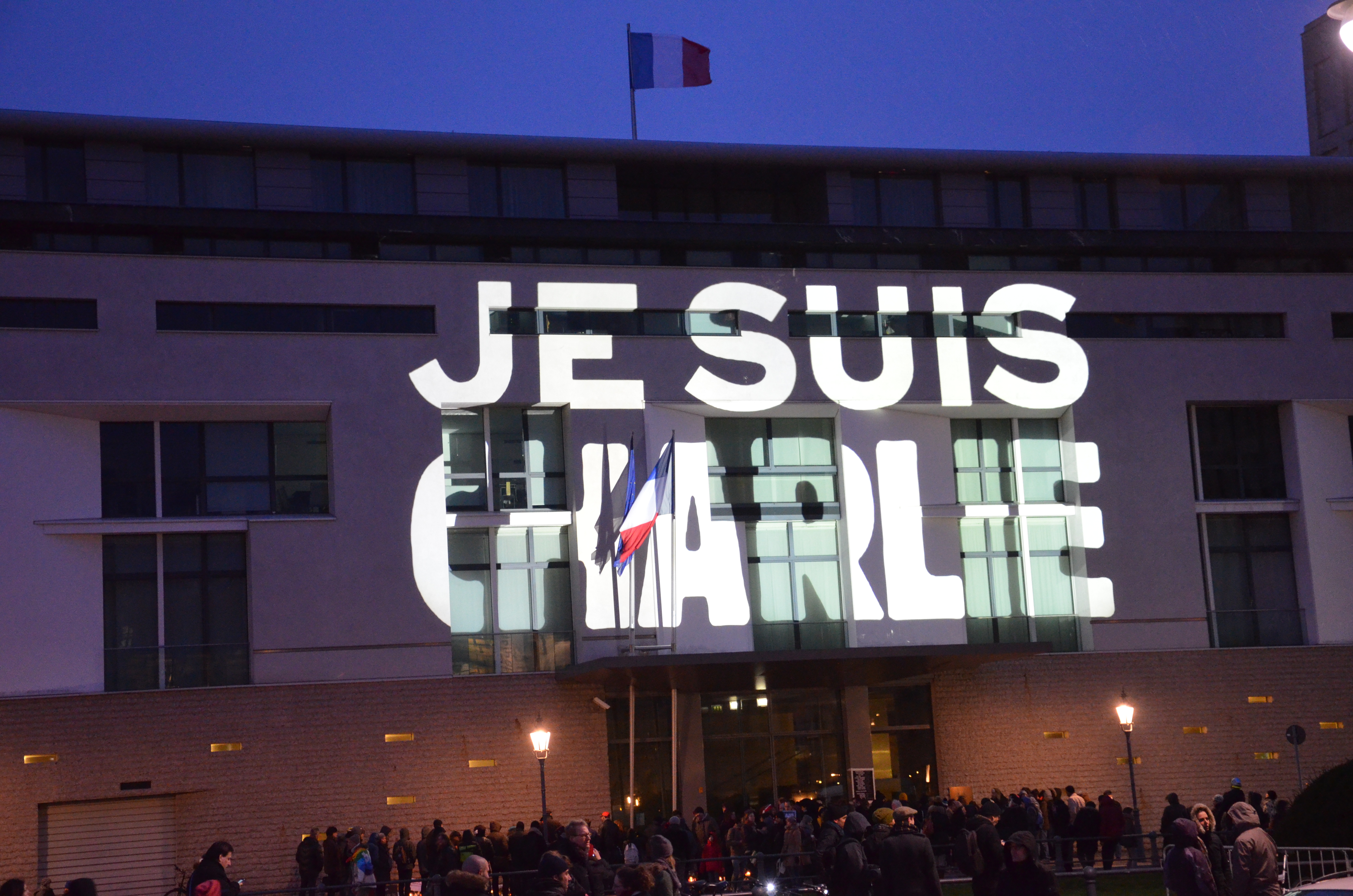
Candlelight vigil at the French embassy in Berlin, Germany

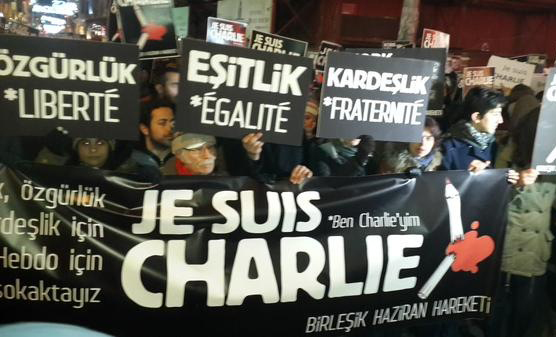
Tributes to the victims in Istanbul, Turkey, on 8 January 2015

The Je suis Charlie slogan and translations were used on placards and mobile phone displays at vigils and demonstrations in many cities in France, Europe, North America, South America, Oceania and some Asian cities.

=== Media and other websites ===
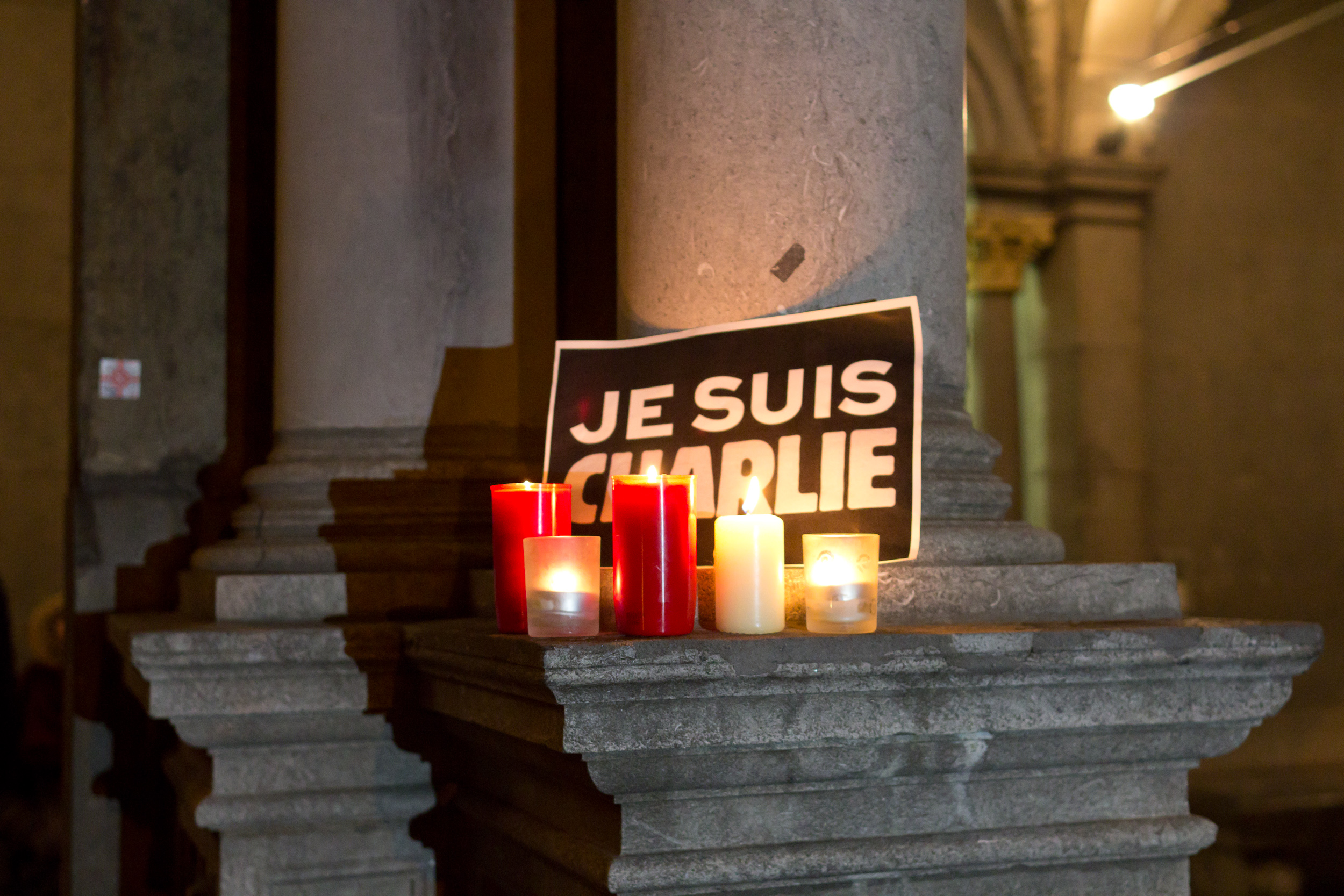
Rally in support of the shooting victims, in Cologne, Germany

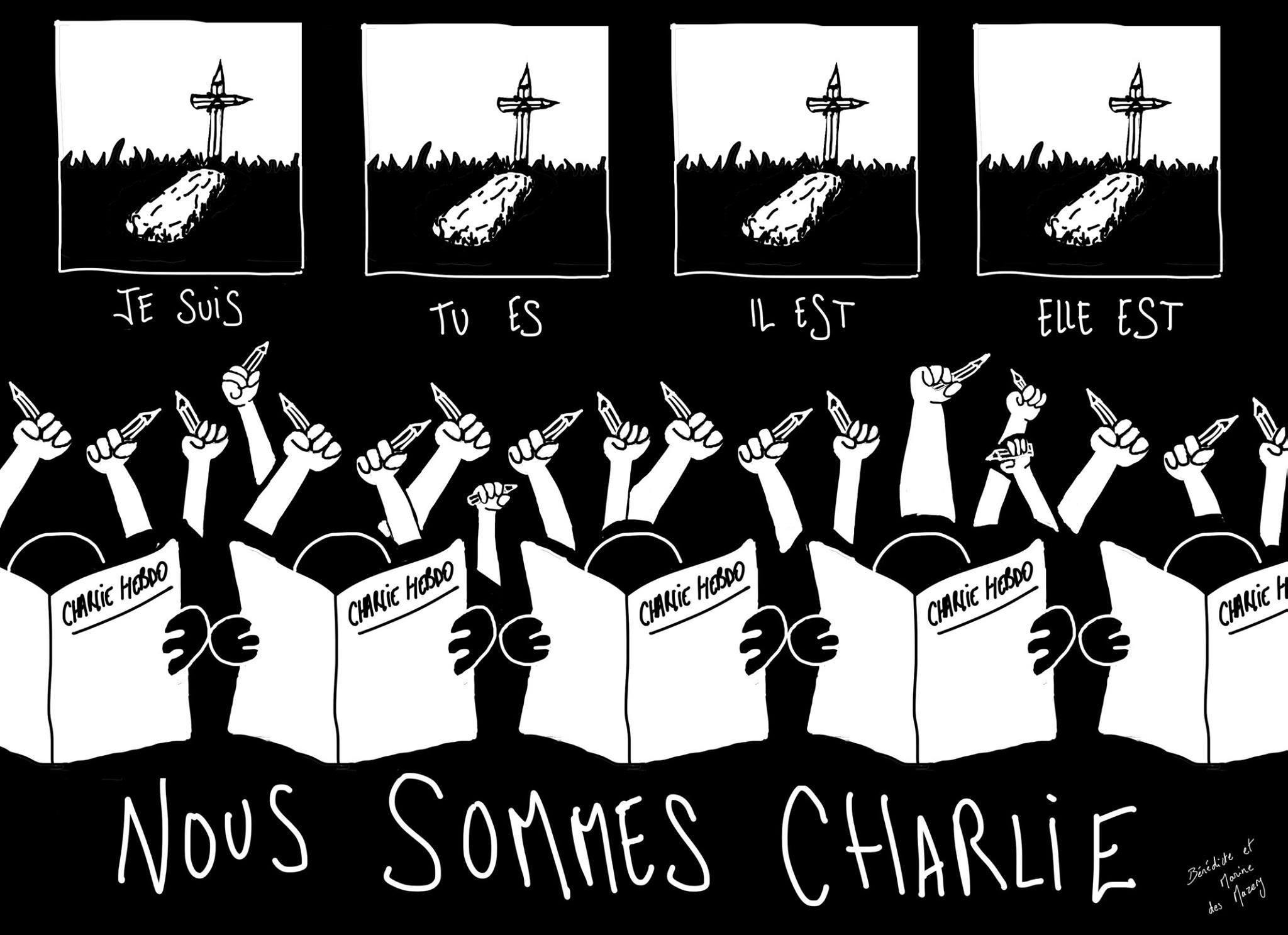
"Nous sommes Charlie" (We are Charlie) – CESAN students

"Je suis Charlie" was used on the following websites:

- Libération, Le Monde, and Le Figaro and other French media used it as a banner across the top of their websites.
- The Spectator writer Alex Massie in his article "Je Suis Charlie."
- On 7 January, Reddit changed its logo to show its mascot holding a Je suis Charlie placard.
- More than 30 journalism agencies and organizations in the United States (including the National Press Photographers Association, the Online News Association, the Society of Professional Journalists, the Newseum, the National Press Club, and the Newspaper Association of America) joined Charlie Hebdo in solidarity by adding their names to a Je suis Charlie banner.
- On 8 January, Belgian financial newspaper De Tijd and French newspapers Libération and L'indépendant issued entirely black front pages referencing the Je suis Charlie slogan.
- Daily Mirror, Irish Mirror, Manchester Evening News, Liverpool Echo, and other Trinity Mirror titles used it as a banner across their websites.
- Spotify had the hashtag #jesuischarlie on the player homepage.
- Editors of the Estonian newspaper Postimees used the slogan in their group photo, in both French and in Estonian.
- Editors of the Swedish newspaper Aftonbladet used the slogan as the header of their website, the logo was used in French. On 8 January, the paper changed the logo of the paper from Aftonbladet to Je suis Charlie using the same typeface as the paper's original logo.
- AFNIC, the non-profit that manages French domain names, built an ASCII art picture of the phrase into all WHOIS requests for French domain names.
- Google France and Apple Inc France both placed Je suis Charlie pictures on their homepages.
- 19 January – 5 February 2015 issue of the American magazine TV Guide featured the inclusion of the "Je suis Charlie" button next to its logo on the front cover.
- The editorial committee of the Latin crosswords magazine Hebdomada Aenigmatum translated the slogan in Latin language "Ego sum Carolus" and used it for the cover and for some of the puzzles in their January 2015 issue.

=== Music ===
- On 8 January, musician JB Bullet performed a song called Je suis Charlie, set to the tune of 1975 French hit "Hexagone" by Renaud. It gained 2.5 million views on YouTube.
- On 8 January, Malian rapper Oxmo Puccino performed his own song called "Je Suis Charlie" on the show "Le Before du Grand Journal" on Canal+.
- On 9 January, slam poet Grand Corps Malade shared a performance called Je suis Charlie (set to music) in tribute to the victims. He said, "I write for them because I cannot draw." It had more than 2 million YouTube views by 12 January.
- On 10 January, French reggae group Tryo uploaded a song called "Charlie" with lyrics including the Je suis Charlie phrase.
- In April 2015, former EBN-OZN frontman, Robert Ozn who later performed under the solo moniker Dada Nada, announced on his Twitter and Facebook feeds that he was making his first record in 25 years, "Je Suis Charlie," because he was "sick and tired of artists being so horribly abused." His Twitter profile contains #JeSuisCharlie and states "Stop killing Artists/Writers! Back in Studio Standing Up for Freedom of Speech/Expression."
- Indie rock group Portugal. The Man released a music video on YouTube with the lyric "Fist in the air, Je Suis Charlie" on 1 December 2016.

=== Street art ===
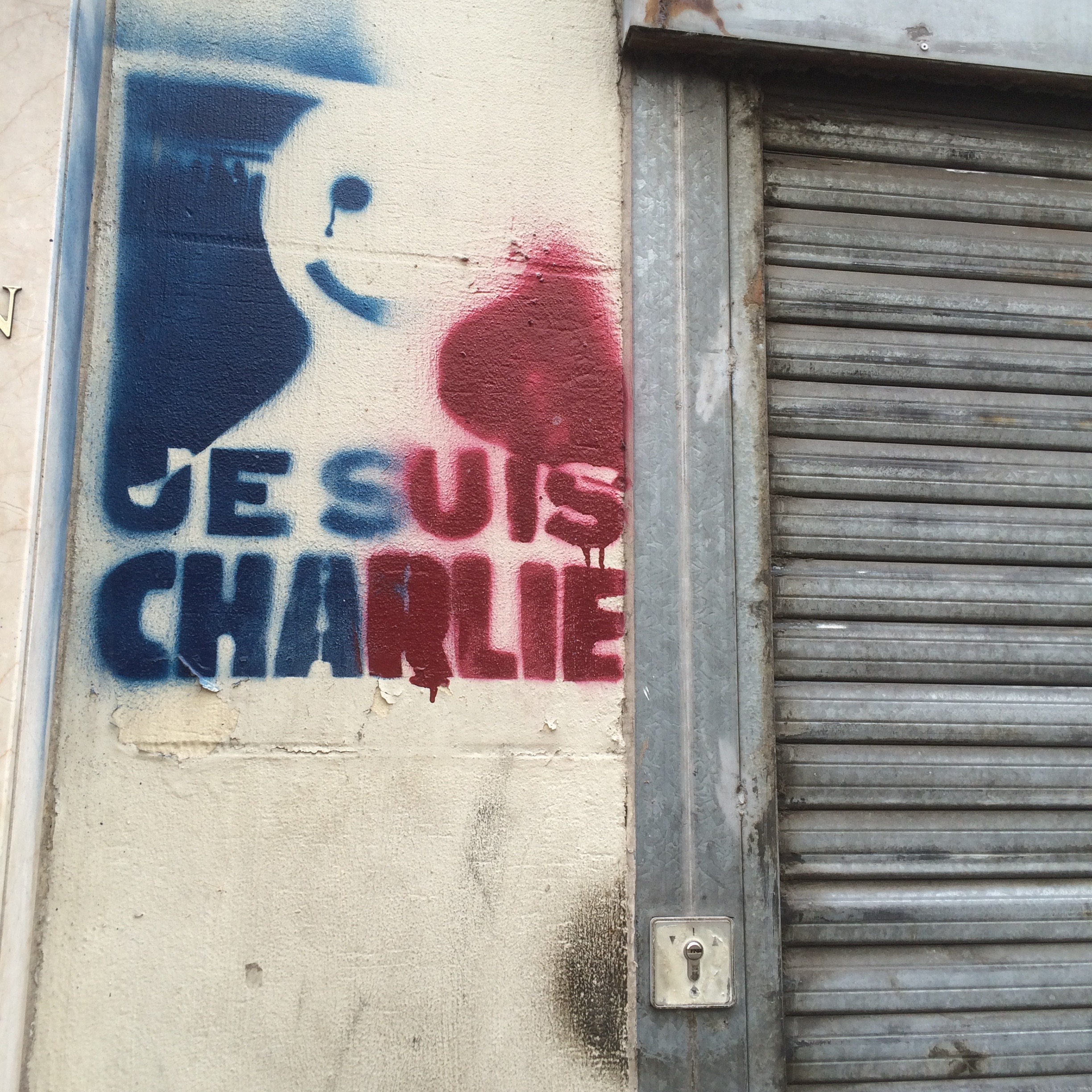
The Je suis Charlie slogan graffitied in Paris, July 2015

The Je suis Charlie slogan showed up all over the world in street art and graffiti, especially in Paris, as a tribute to victims of the terrorist attacks.

- In Paris, artists painted tributes, murals, and the slogan all over the city to remember the victims.
- In Los Angeles, an artist created an installation with oversized pencils engraved with the slogan.

=== Television ===
On United States television programs, there were several notable uses of the slogan. On 8 January, Jon Stewart closed the episode of The Daily Show with Je suis Charlie in a cartoon. On 11 January, The Simpsons episode, "Bart's New Friend" featured Maggie holding a black banner reading Je suis Charlie in a manner similar to either Eugène Delacroix's Liberty Leading the People, or an iconic drawing by Emile Bayard of the character of Cosette from Victor Hugo's novel Les Misérables, made famous as a publicity image for the novel's musical adaptation. It was shown after the conclusion of the program.

==== Golden Globe Awards ====
The 72nd Golden Globe Awards show, held 11 January in Beverly Hills, was the first major entertainment event to take place after the killings. Prior to the awards show, film producer Harvey Weinstein penned a lengthy open letter to Hollywood in Variety about the attacks and the importance of free speech, writing that he hoped there would be displays of "solidarity" at the awards, before ending his letter with "Je suis Charlie, je suis juif, je suis Ahmed." ("I am Charlie, I am Jewish, I am Ahmed.")

At the show, stars including George and Amal Clooney, Kathy Bates, Helen Mirren, Diane Kruger, Joshua Jackson and William H. Macy, wore Je Suis Charlie on pins affixed to their clothes or handbags, held signs with the slogan or used the phrase in red carpet interviews. In his acceptance speech for the Cecil B. DeMille Award, George Clooney wore a Je suis Charlie pin on his lapel and said, "Millions of people – not just in Paris but around the world, Christians and Jews and Muslims, leaders of countries all over the world – they didn't march in protest, they marched in support of the idea that we will not walk in fear. We won't do it. So Je suis Charlie." Jared Leto used the term in a speech before presenting an award.

=== Sports ===
- Two French NBA players wore T-shirts bearing the motto during pregame warmups: Nicolas Batum of the Portland Trail Blazers on 8 January and Kevin Séraphin of the Washington Wizards the next night.
- Italian football club S.S. Lazio wore the motto on their uniforms during a match on 11 January against A.S. Roma.
- Supporters of Olympique de Marseille cheered under a screen displaying the words Je suis Charlie before their football match on 9 January in Montpellier, France.
- On 12 January 2015, during the game of the Rethymno Cretan Kings B.C. against the Aries Trikala B.C. for the Greek Basket League, the cheerleaders and the mascot of the home team wore T-shirts bearing the motto.
- On 13 January 2015, supporters of the Greek Volleyball team AON Pannaxiakos Naxos during the match against the French team Le Cannet for the CEV Women's Challenge Cup raised panels with the slogan "Je suis Charlie".

=== Exhibitions ===
An exhibition titled "Je suis Charlie" honoring free expression was held in Drammen Theater on 27 February 2015. The exhibition which was arranged by the Universal Tolerance Organization featured 100 religious and political cartoons from 40 countries. Due to security concerns there were no cartoons of Mohammed and the exhibition only stayed open for six hours with heavily armed police present.

=== Place name ===
The day after the attack, Jean-Pierre Tallieu, mayor of the city of La Tremblade, a suburb of Royan, Charente-Maritime, named a public square "Je suis Charlie Place" to perpetuate the memory of the victims. A temporary plaque was inaugurated on 10 January and will be permanently replaced once the paperwork is completed to register the new name.

=== Software ===
Notepad++ version 6.7.4, released on 10 January 2015, was named Je suis Charlie. In response the website was hacked by the Tunisian Fallaga Team, accusing Notepad++ of calling Islam a terrorist religion. GNU parallel's release 20150122 was named ((:~{> Je Suis Charlie.

Several developers produced applications for smartphones. On Android, apps appeared to display the various versions of the "Je suis Charlie" slogan. French developers from the news agency Nice-Matin launched a Je suis Charlie smartphone app for iOS and Android. Installing the free app and giving it access to the phone's location adds a dot on a map alongside other supporters. While new iOS apps typically take at least a week to be vetted, the agency e-mailed Apple CEO Tim Cook and the app was approved in one hour after the shootings.

=== Commercial use ===
Within days of the attack, merchandise featuring Je suis Charlie was available for sale around the world. This led to critical questioning of whether businesses were profiting off the tragedy or simply responding to market demand. By 12 January, eBay had more than 5,000 items on its site, including T-shirts, mugs, artwork, pins, posters, hats, phone cases, keychains and dogtags. The auction company announced it would donate fees earned from Je suis Charlie-related sales in France.

On 8 January, French mail order company 3 Suisses drew criticism for appropriating the slogan for social media self-promotion after tweeting an image with the words "Je Suisses Charlie." It removed the slogan the same day and apologized. eBay stated it would remove any items featuring the slogan that were "inconsistent with its regulations, principles and values." The Hoxton Hotel chain was criticized for including "#jesuischarile [sic]" in a Facebook post promoting its new Paris hotel. The firm later published a post saying its intent was only to show solidarity with Paris.

The domain name jesuischarlie.com was registered on the same day as the attack and featured an automatic redirect to the Charlie Hebdo website. Jesuischarlie.net, jesuischarlie.fr and iamcharlie.fr were also registered but initially had no content.

A trademark application for the combination of words "Je suis Charlie" was filed at the Benelux Trademark Office on 8 January 2015 in the evening hours by Yanick Uytterhaegen of Brussels, who claims he wants to use the trademark to raise money for Charlie Hebdo. The trademark application covers several classes of the international classification including Classes 3, 25 35 and 38.

== Influences ==
=== Echoes ===
After the Baga Massacre the hashtag #Jesuisnigeria was used to express support for Nigeria as well as point out the lack of media coverage of the event compared to the Charlie Hebdo shooting.

Following the flogging of Saudi blogger Raif Badawi for the crimes of "insulting Islam", the hashtag #Jesuisraif trended on Twitter.

The hashtag #jesuisahmed ("I am Ahmed") was used to express solidarity with Ahmed Merabet, a Muslim police officer whose murder in the street by the attackers was captured on video.

After the siege at the kosher Hypercacher supermarket in Vincennes on 9 January, the Je suis Hypercacher slogan was launched on an eponymous website after four hostages were shot dead. As the victims were targeted on account of their Jewish religion, people tweet the hashtag #JeSuisJuif ("I am Jewish") in honor of the victims.

Following an attack on a bus on 13 January that killed 12 people near Volnovakha, eastern Ukraine, Ukrainian President Petro Poroshenko posted an image on Facebook of a bullet-riddled bus above the caption Je Suis Volnovakha. On 18 January, thousands of Ukrainians marched in Kyiv and Odesa to commemorate the victims, holding signs reading Je Suis Volnovakha and Я Волноваха.

French far-right activists, including Generation Identity and National Front MEP Jean-Marie Le Pen, adopted the slogan "Je suis Charlie Martel", in reference to the Frankish king who defeated an Islamic invasion in 732 AD.

Roger Cukierman, president of CRIF, a Jewish umbrella organisation in France, spoke against supporters of the Charlie Hebdo attackers who were using the hashtag "#IamKouachi" on social media, which he called "an apology for murder."

French comedian Dieudonné was arrested the week after the shootings after stating on Facebook that: "Tonight, as far as I'm concerned, I feel like Charlie Coulibaly", which, according to The Guardian, "[mixed] the slogan 'Je suis Charlie' ... with a reference to gunman Amedy Coulibaly".

British Liberal Democrat MP David Ward, known for his opposition to Israel, tweeted "Je suis Palestinian" while watching the Republican marches, which together with other comments drew condemnation from his party leader, Deputy Prime Minister Nick Clegg.

On 16 January 2015, protests against the continued creation of cartoons depicting Muhammad turned violent in several countries, including Algeria, Nigeria and Pakistan. Protesters shouted "I am not Charlie, I am Muhammad" and President of Turkey Recep Tayyip Erdoğan stated that the cartoons had nothing to do with freedom of expression, but rather with "terrorising the freedom of others." In the city of Zinder, 4 died and 45 were wounded battling police.

In response to the issue of Charlie Hebdo following the shooting (Charlie Hebdo issue No. 1178), a protest in Australia had signs saying "Je suis Muslim".

In response to the apparent murder of prosecutor Alberto Nisman in Argentina in January 2015 protesters used "#Yo soy Nisman" and "Je suis Nisman" as slogans, while in response to the assassination of Russian politician Boris Nemtsov in February 2015, placards saying "Je suis Boris Nemtsov" were held up during the protest march in Moscow.

After the 13 November 2015 Paris attacks, the slogan and layout was adopted and widely reused as "Je suis Paris".

After a police raid in Saint-Denis that killed Paris attacks mastermind Abdelhamid Abaaoud, the hashtags #JeSuisDiesel and #JeSuisChien (I am dog) were used in tribute to Diesel, a police dog who died in the raid.

Variation on Je suis Charlie in support of the victims of different terrorist attacks

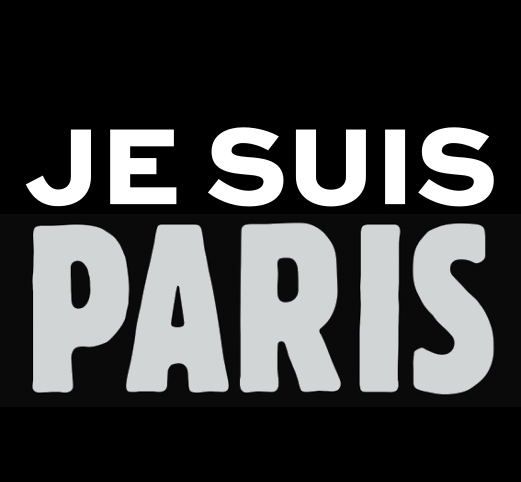
Paris, 2015/11

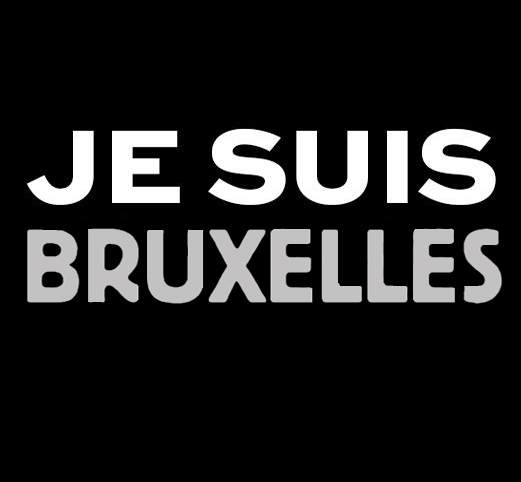
Brussels, 2016

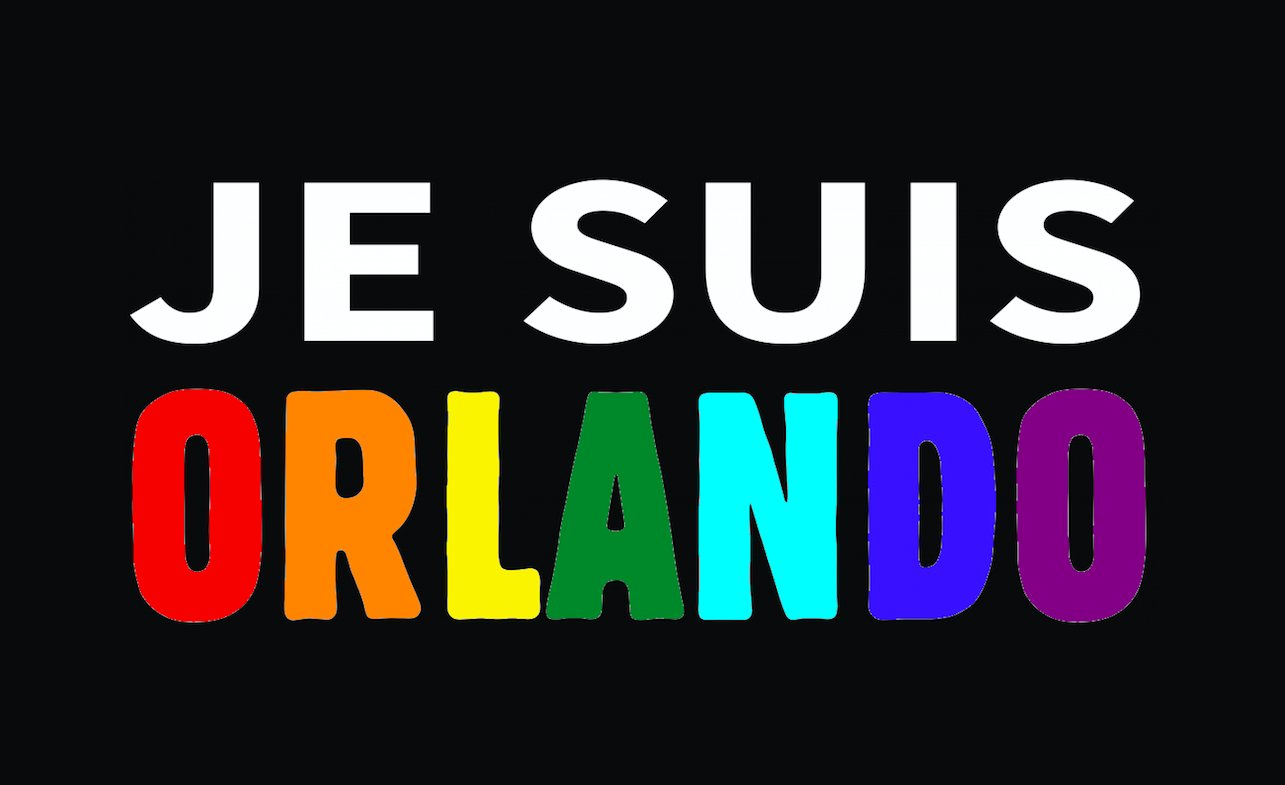
Orlando, 2016

The hashtag #JeSuisDaphne was used on the Maltese social media following the murder of the journalist and blogger Daphne Caruana Galizia in October 2017.

Messages reading "Je suis Strasbourg" were left at makeshift shrines following the 2018 Strasbourg attack.

The hashtags #Je Suis Prof and #Je Suis Enseignant, both meaning "I am a teacher", were launched in support of Samuel Paty, a French schoolteacher murdered and beheaded in 2020, and in support of freedom of expression.

=== Sociolinguistic influences ===
In addition to giving rise to various #jesuis hashtags across languages, the hashtag #jesuischarlie was suggested to significantly boost the prevalence of indicative mood hashtags on French Twitter.

== Translations ==
Charlie Hebdo staff hastily created a PDF of seven translations of Je suis Charlie which they made available on their website shortly after it returned to service. The pages appear to be scans of laser printed output, and are in a variety of fonts.

Each translation is three words; where "I am" is a single word (or "am" has been elided), "Hebdo" has been added.

1. Persian: من شارلی هستم (man Sharli hastam)
2. German: Ich bin Charlie
3. Spanish: Yo soy Charlie
4. Slovak: Som Charlie Hebdo
5. Czech: Jsem Charlie Hebdo
6. Arabic: انا شارلي (ʾanā Sharili)
7. Russian: Я Шарли Эбдо (Ya Sharli Ebdo)
Translations of "Je suis Charlie" issued by the Charlie Hebdo on the following day
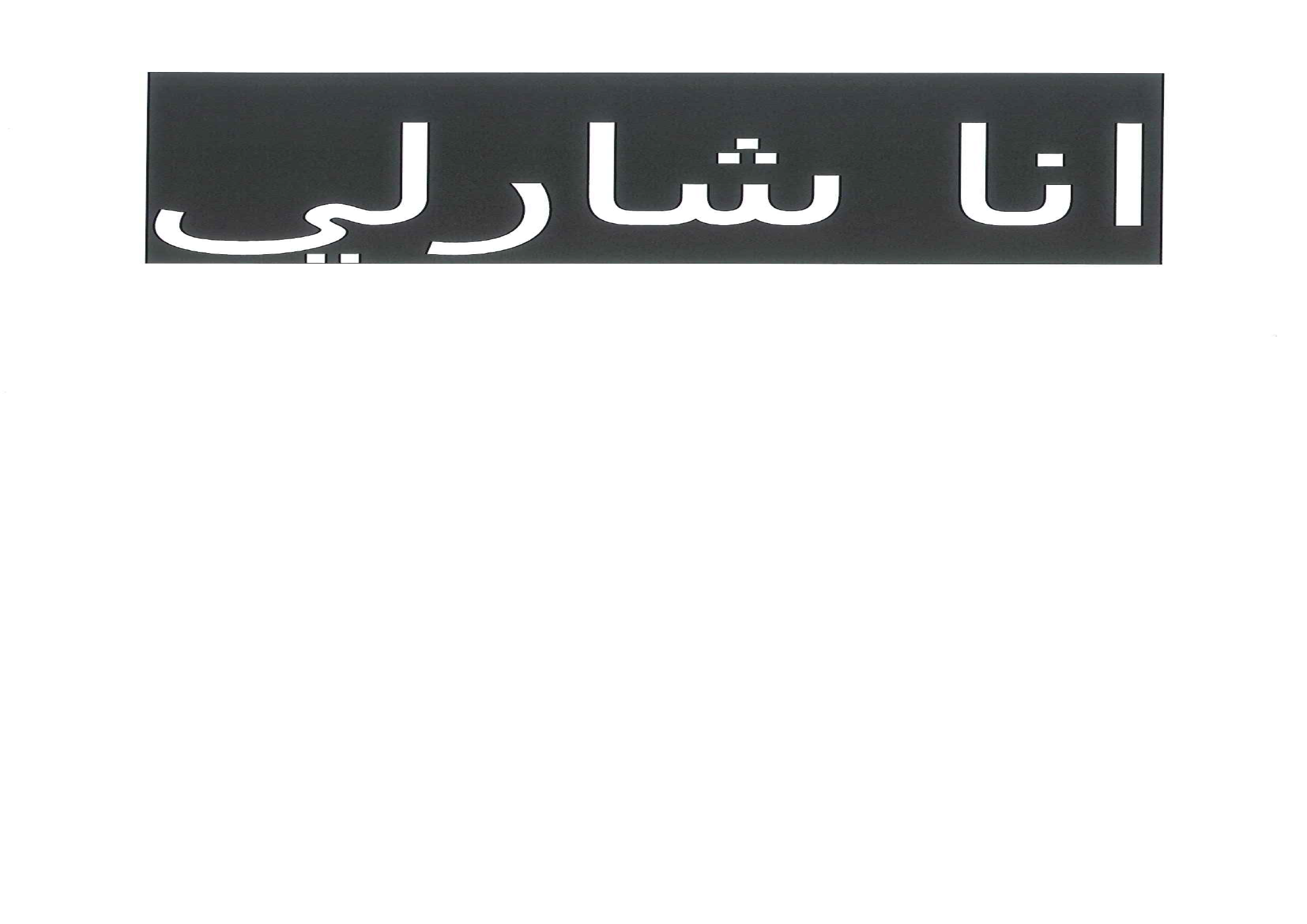
Arabic

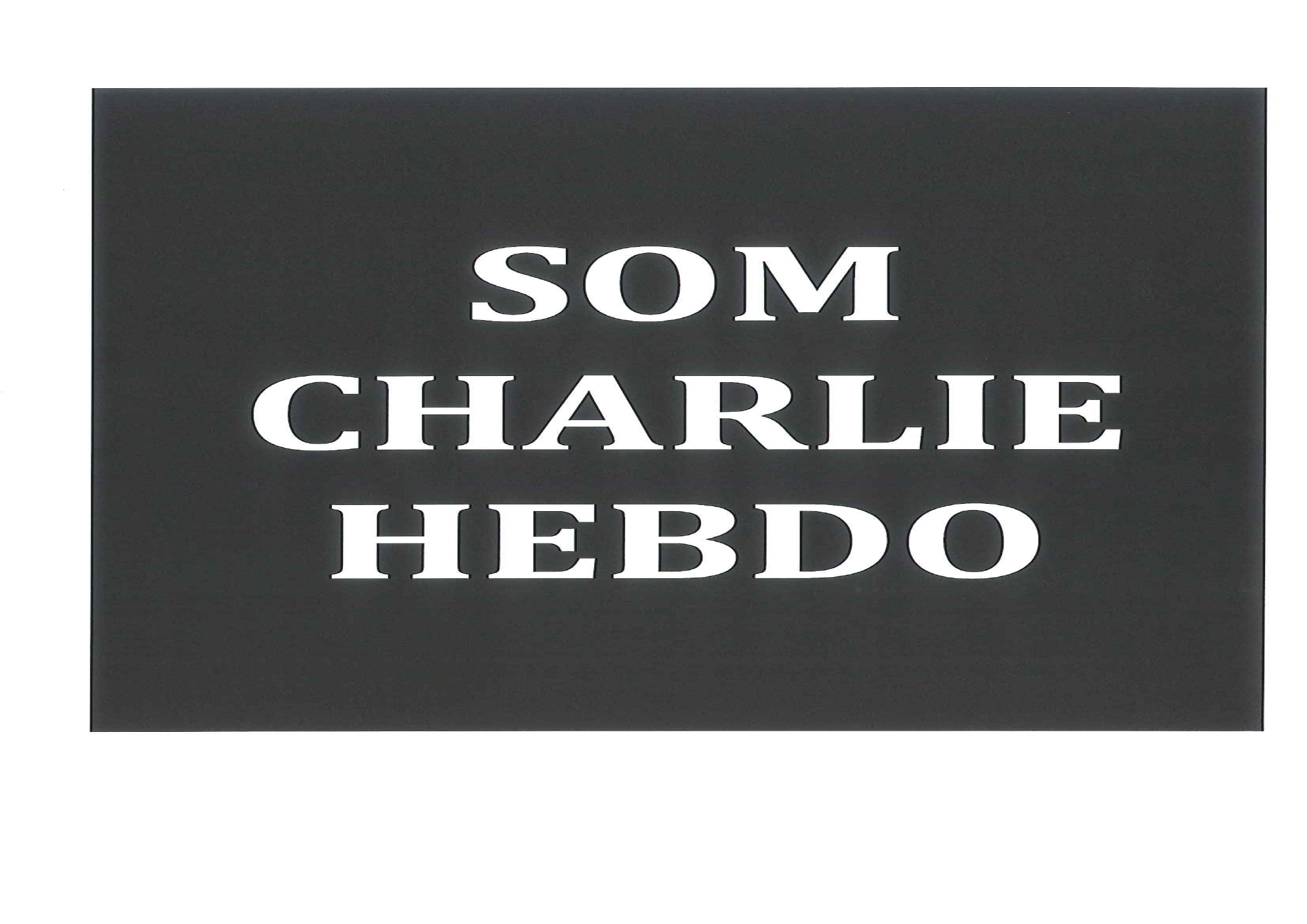
Slovak

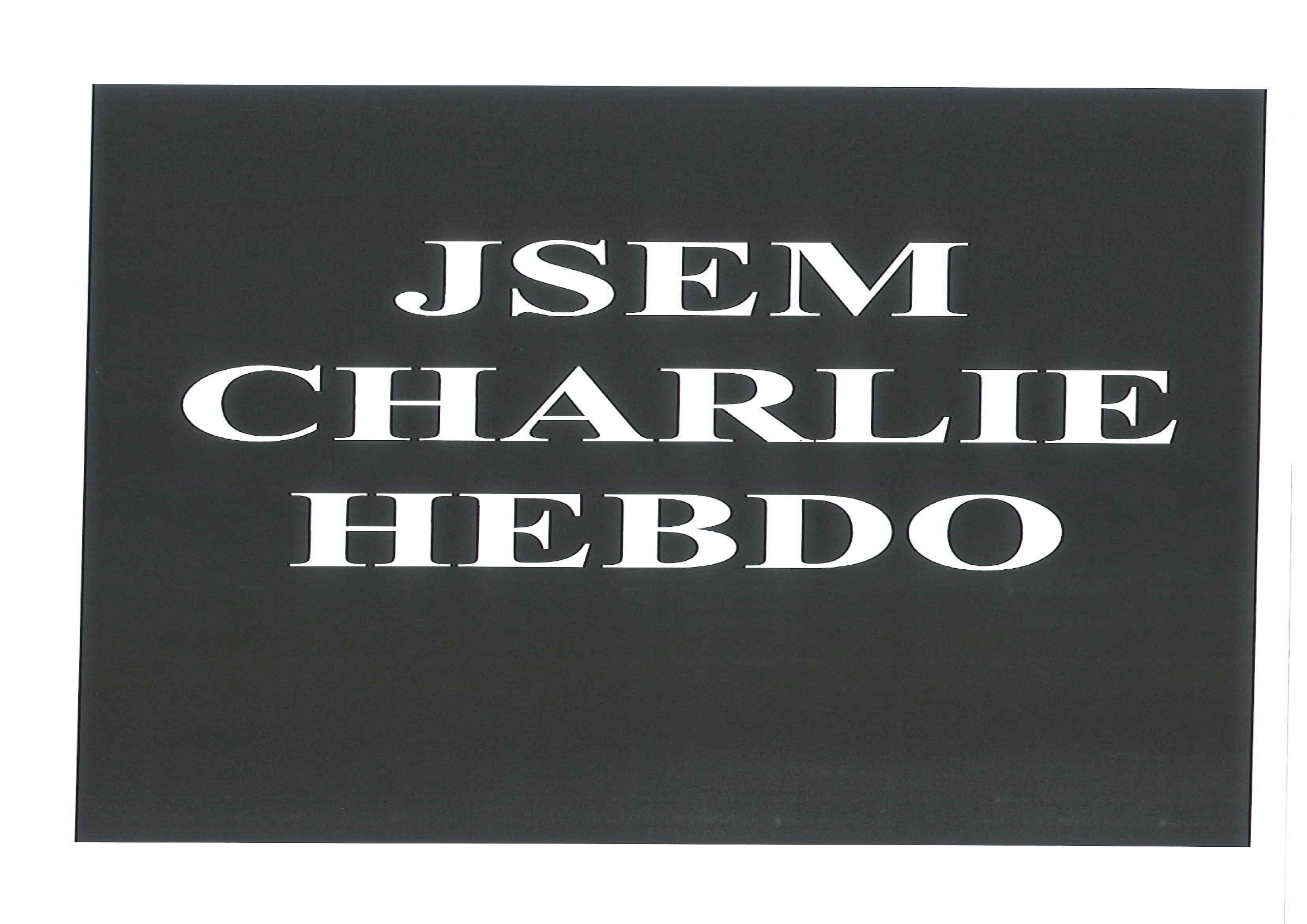
Czech

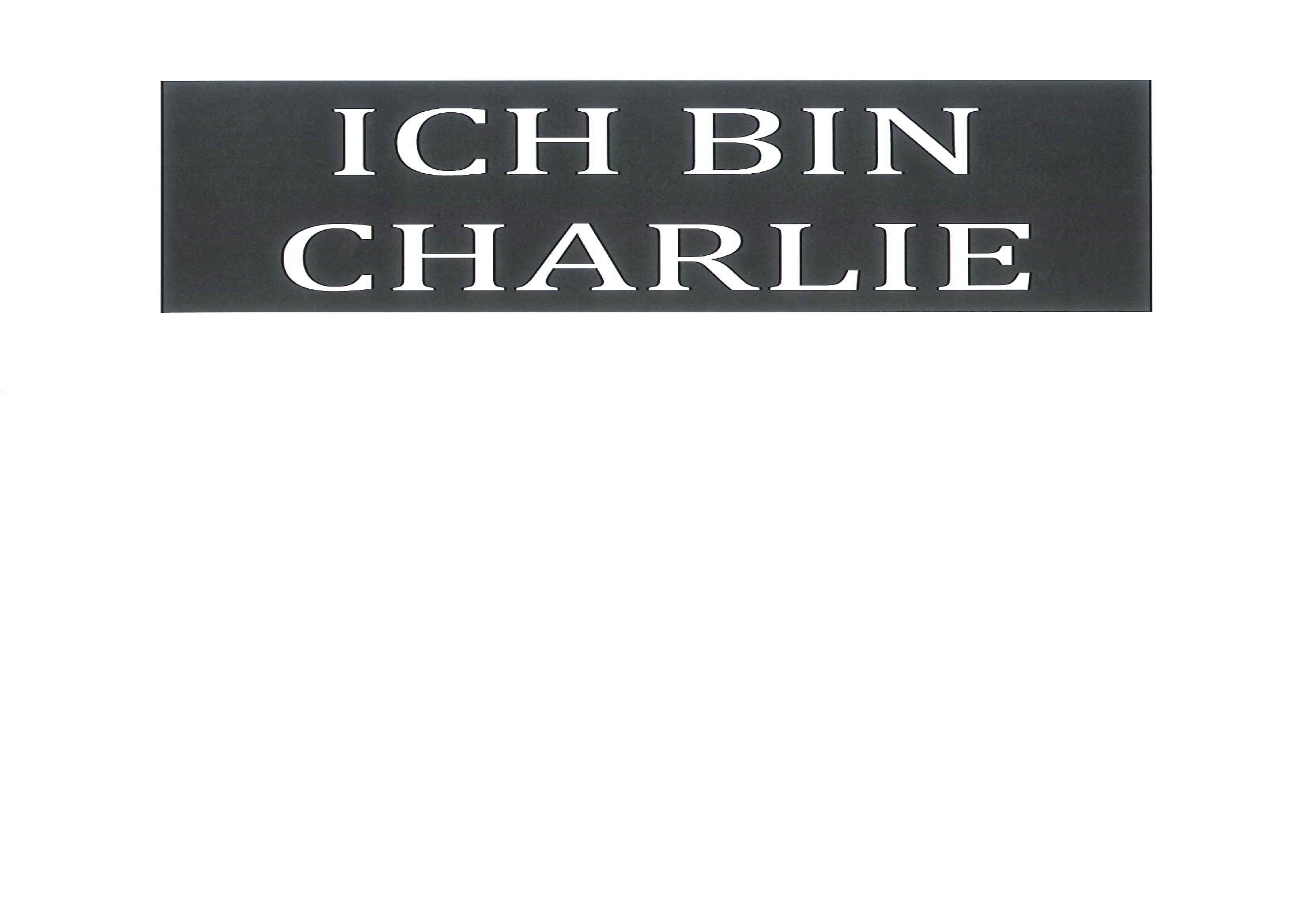
German

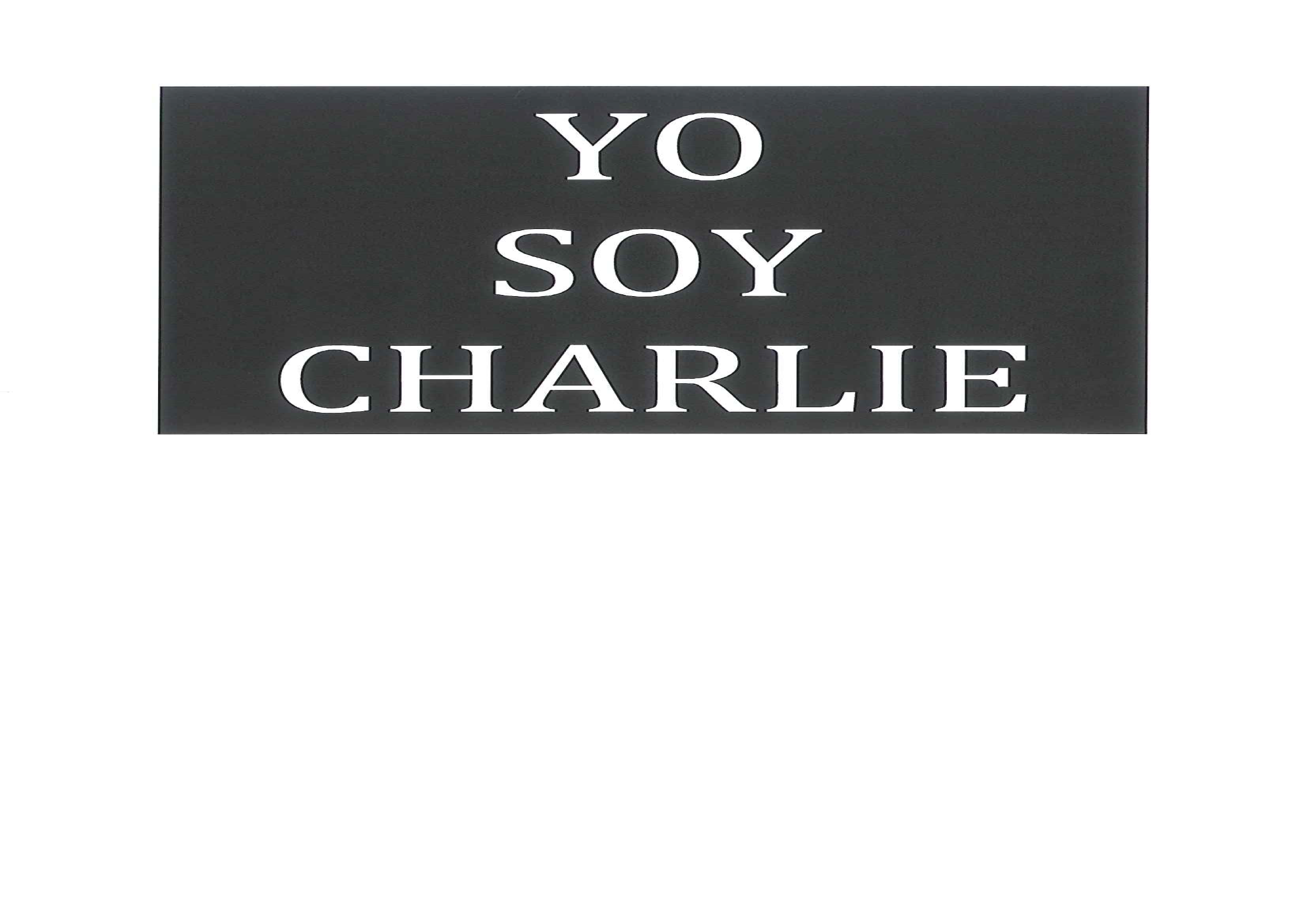
Spanish

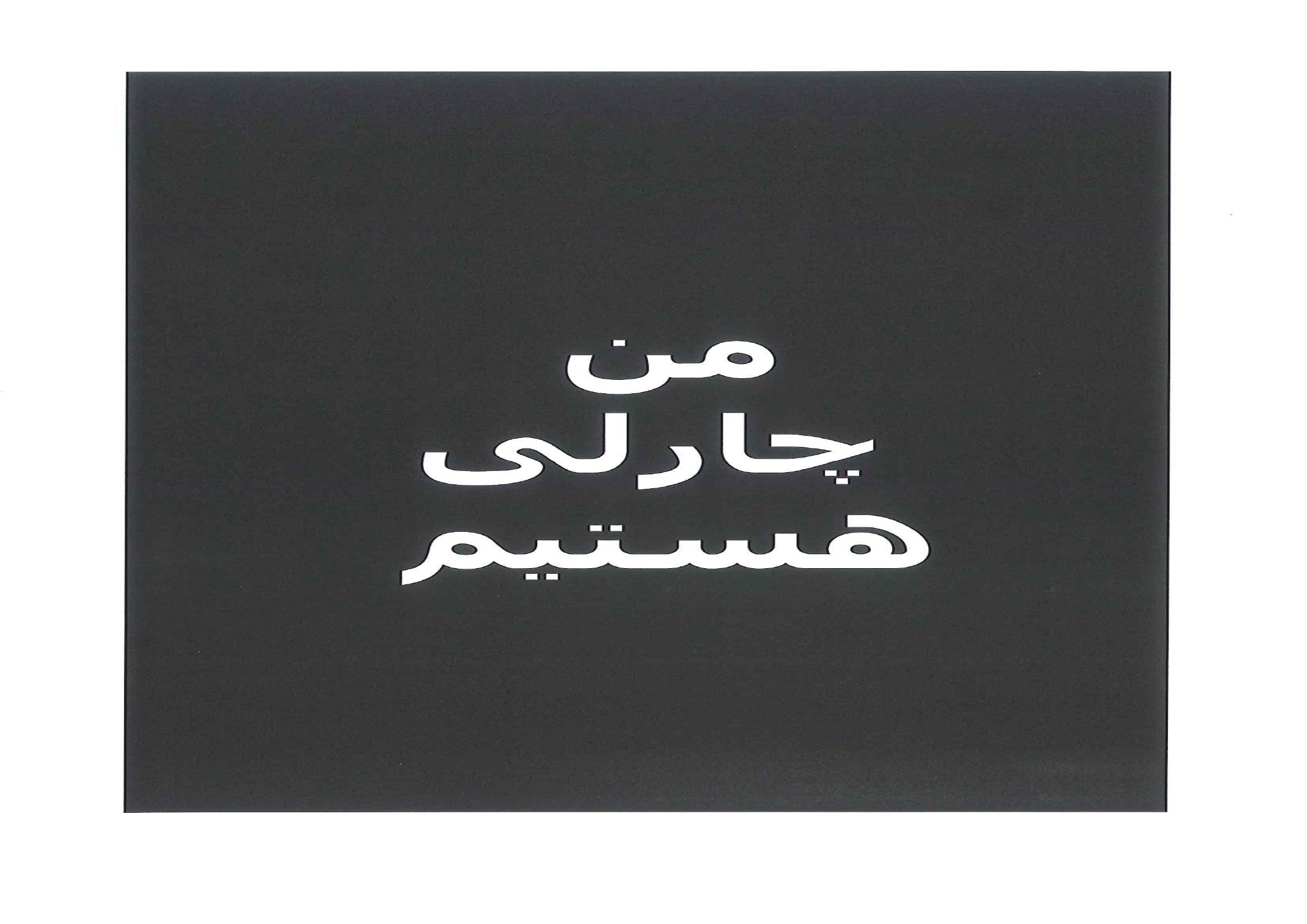
Persian

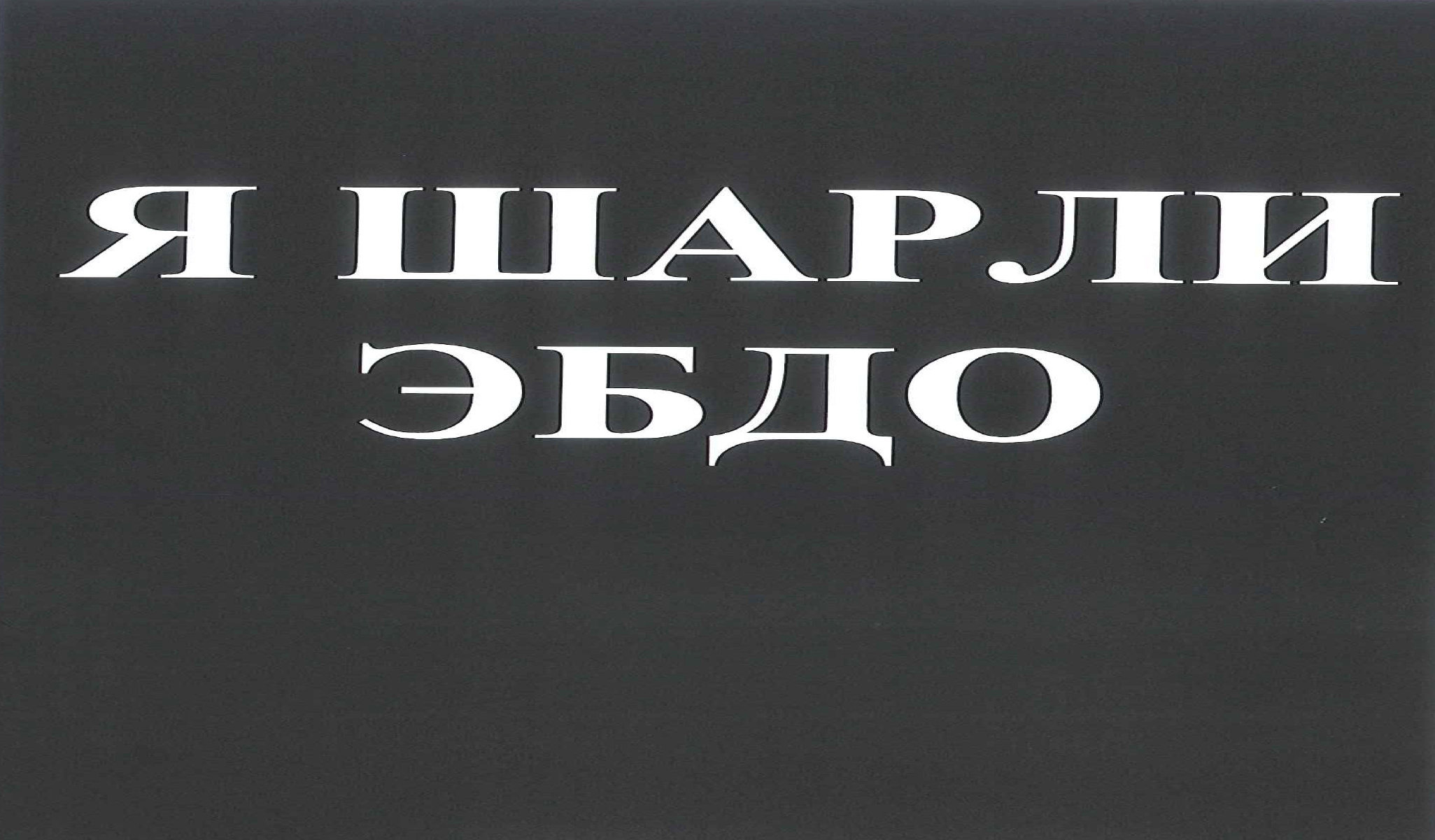
Russian

Independent translations, in Czech, for example, did not use the "Hebdo", sticking with "Jsem Charlie".

== See also ==
- Jyllands Posten Muhammad cartoons controversy – 2005 controversy surrounding the depiction of Muhammad
- Reactions to the November 2015 Paris attacks
- Volnovakha bus attack – Rocket strike on a Ukrainian highway checkpoint
