= Héritier =

Héritier (from the French word héritier meaning heir) may refer to:

- Charles Louis L'Héritier de Brutelle (1746–1800), botanist and taxonomist
- Françoise Héritier (1933–2017), anthropologist
- Heritier Lumumba (born 1986), Australian rules footballer
- Louis L’Héritier, captain of the French ship Hercule
- L'Héritier (film), a 1973 film directed by Philippe Labro, starring Jean-Paul Belmondo
