= Joachim Roncin =

French journalist and artist

- The standard layout for Roncin's slogan, as copied from the Charlie Hebdo site
- Born: January 27, 1976 (age 50); Paris, France

Joachim Roncin (born January 27, 1976) is a French journalist and graphic designer. He is best known for being the author of the slogan "Je suis Charlie" (French for 'I am Charlie') following the 2015 terror attack on the offices of political magazine Charlie Hebdo.

Roncin was working as a music journalist and art director for Stylist magazine when he posted the phrase "Je suis Charlie" onto Twitter within 25 minutes of the attack at the offices of Charlie Hebdo in Paris.

Roncin participated as the Director of Design for the 2024 Summer Olympics in Paris.
