= Nicole Bacharan =

French historian and political scientist

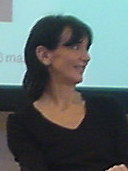
- Born: 25 January 1955 (age 71); Saint-Gaudens, France
- Education: Sciences Po; College of Europe; European University Institute
- Occupation: Historian • Political scientist

Nicole Bacharan (born 25 January 1955) is a French historian and political scientist specializing in American society and French-American relations. She is a researcher with the National Foundation for Political Science (Sciences Po) and was a National Fellow at the Hoover Institution at Stanford University in California from 2013 to 2014.

Famous for her books and her TV appearances and radio broadcasts in France and the United States, she is the author of numerous essays including several bestsellers, "Faut-il avoir peur de l’Amérique ?" (Should We Be Afraid of America?) and "Américains-Arabes, l’affrontement" (Americans-Arabs, The Confrontation). In collaboration with Dominique Simonnet, she also writes novels in the Némo series.

On September 11, 2001, live from the France 2 evening news show hosted by David Pujadas, she left a mark on French television-watchers when she said "Tonight, we are all Americans," a phrase repeated the following day in the newspaper Le Monde.

== TV appearances and radio broadcasts ==
In France, Nicole Bacharan, nicknamed by The New Economist "Miss America", is a radio contributor for Europe 1 on international politics, questions concerning the United States, and transatlantic relations. She is also a contributor to numerous television programs in France and Europe (TF1, France 2, France 3, TV5, I Television).

In the United States, she has given many interviews on these same topics to The New York Times, The Washington Post or NPR, and appears on CNN, ABC and other networks.

== Speaker ==
Bacharan gives frequent conferences for numerous organizations, including "L'Alliance française", the French American Foundation, "l'Association France-Amérique", "l'Association France-Etats Unis".

From 1997 to 2002, she taught a seminar in English at the Institut d’Etudes Politiques de Paris on contemporary America (The New American Dream). She is also a member of the scientific committee of the Blois Historical Association and the History-Science Commission on Man and Society at the National Book Center.

== Books ==
- 11 septembre, le jour du chaos, avec Dominique Simonnet, Ed. Perrin, 2011
- La Plus Belle Histoire des femmes, avec Françoise Héritier, Michelle Perrot, Sylviane Agasinski, Seuil, 2011
- Les Noirs américains, des champs de coton à la Maison blanche , Éd. Perrin, 2010
- La Plus Belle Histoire de la liberté, avec André Glucksmann et Abdelwahab Meddeb, postface by Václav Havel, Seuil, 2009
- Le Petit livre des élections américaines, Éd. du Panama, 2008
- Les Noirs américains , Éd. du Panama, 2008
- Pourquoi nous avons besoin des Américains, Seuil, mars 2007
- Américains, Arabes : l’affrontement (avec Antoine Sfeir), Seuil, septembre 2006
- Faut-il avoir peur de l’Amérique ? Seuil, octobre 2005
- Good Morning America, Seuil, 2001
- L’amour expliqué à nos enfants, avec Dominique Simonnet, Seuil, 2000
- Le Piège : quand la démocratie perd la tête, Seuil, 1998
- Histoire des Noirs américains au XXème siècle, Complexe, 1994

Novels, with Dominique Simonnet :

- Némo dans les Étoiles, Seuil, 2004
- Némo en Égypte, Seuil, 2002
- Némo en Amérique, Seuil, 2001
- Le Livre de Némo, Seuil, 1998

== Order ==
The President of France awarded her with the Legion of Honor in 2007.
