= Françoise Héritier =

French anthropologist (1933-2017)

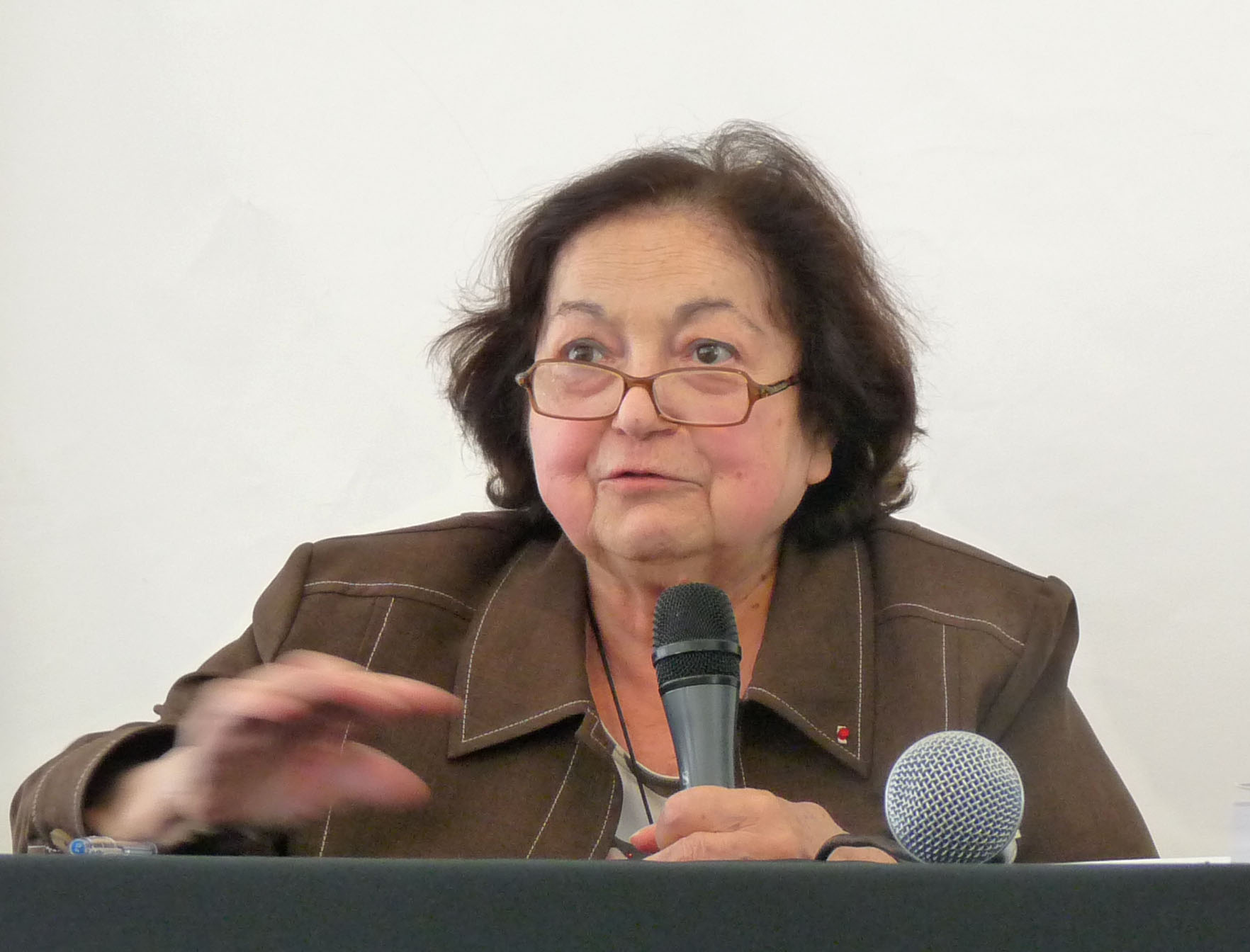
- Born: 15 November 1933; Veauche, Loire, France
- Died: 15 November 2017 (aged 84); Paris, France

Philosophical work
- Region: Anthropology, ethnology
- Notable ideas: The differential valence of the sexes

Françoise Héritier (15 November 1933 – 15 November 2017) was a French anthropologist, ethnologist, and feminist. She was the successor to Claude Lévi-Strauss to hold the chair of anthropology at the Collège de France, and held the inaugural chair of Comparative Study of African Societies from 1983. Her work dealt mainly with the theory of alliances and on the prohibition of incest, both theories based on the notion of exchange of women. In addition to Lévi-Strauss, she was also influenced by Alfred Radcliffe-Brown.

== Early life and education ==
Françoise Héritier was born on 15 November 1933 at Veauche, a commune in the Loire department in central France. She grew up in a social background that she described as a "small and reasonable bourgeoisie that came out of the peasantry". She studied in Paris at the Lycée Racine, and later in the hypokhâgne at the Lycée Fénelon, Paris.

She studied history, geography, and then ethnology at the Sorbonne University and at the Musée de l'Homme. She said that, a seminar given by Claude Lévi-Strauss at the Sorbonne University, in which he talked about the "joking relationship in Fiji", sparked her decision to study ethnology.

== Career ==
In 1957, Héritier went on a mission in French Upper Volta (now Burkina Faso) with the anthropologist Michel Izard, whom she would later marry, with the Samo people. She became a specialist in African ethnology, and joined the French National Centre for Scientific Research (CNRS) in 1967.

Like Claude Lévi-Strauss and his successor Philippe Descola, Françoise Héritier was first a study director at the School for Advanced Studies in the Social Sciences (EHESS) from 1980. Her field of social research focused in particular on male dominance, kinship systems, and the incest taboo.

In 1982 she was appointed Chair of Anthropology at the Collège de France, as the successor to Lévi-Strauss. She was only the second woman to hold this position, the first being Jacqueline de Romilly. She held the inaugural chair of Comparative Study of African Societies from 1983.

From 1998 to 2001, she was a member of the CNRS ethics committee.

== Theories and works ==
Héritier was part of the structuralism movement. She is well known for her works in the theory of alliances and the prohibition of incest based on the notion of the circulation of women in the society. She brings the concepts of the "identical" and its "repulsive frustration", in the continuity of the approaches of Lévi-Strauss and Alfred Radcliffe-Brown. In her conception of the societies, she especially focuses on the concepts of "nature" and "environment".

In her book Masculin/Féminin, she noted that the distinction between the feminine and the masculine is universal and that exists everywhere; and that the male is always considered superior to the women. However, she showed in her book, Masculin/Féminin I et II, De la Violence, through numerous examples, the hierarchical thinking regarding men and women is a cultural construct—and therefore to be revisited. She called this concept "the differential valence of the sexes" (la valence différentielle des sexes) that she preferred to the concept of the masculine domination used by Pierre Bourdieu or Maurice Godelier.

== Other activities ==
In February 2005 Héritier addressed an international conference organised by several women's rights organisations and held in Paris, entitled "United against Fundamentalism and for Equality".

In 2011 she discussed her path to feminism with historian Michelle Perrot, philosopher Sylviane Agacinski, and political scientist Nicole Bacharan. She said:

I came to have feminist beliefs in my work as an anthropologist in the face of universal ethnological facts that deserved explanation. I realised that there was a dominant archaic model, based on a differential valence of the sexes, which gradually led to male dominance. My feminism is based on conviction and reason (so it is also a humanism) and not just about indignation. Moreover, I observed inexplicable situations from childhood: thus, in Livrad farms, the mistress of the house did not sit at the table and ate what remained...
It's objectively harder to be a woman than to be a man because men have become used to being used. The Most Beautiful History of Women shows that women internalise their state of dependence but also that they have always found men and women to think and fight.

== Recognition and awards ==
In 1978 she was awarded the CNRS silver medal, for her on the functioning of semi-complex systems of kinship and alliance.

On 8 November 2017 Héritier was awarded a Prix Femina spécial for her whole body of work.

== Personal life ==
Héritier married anthropologist Michel Izard.

== Death ==
Héritier died on her 84th birthday, 15 November 2017, in the Pitié-Salpêtrière Hospital in Paris.

== Works ==
- The Sweetness of Life, Penguin, 2014.
- Two Sisters and Their Mother: The Anthropology of Incest, MIT press, 2000
- Masculin Féminin II: Dissoudre la hiérarchie, Odile Jacob, 2002 - paper edition
- Masculin/Féminin: La pensée de la différence, Odile Jacob, 1996 - paper edition
- Au gré des jours, Odile Jacob, 2017 - paper edition; Prix Femina 2017
