= Sean Taylor (author) =

British author (born 1965)

Sean Taylor is a British author of children's books. He was born in 1965 and grew up in Surrey, England, he taught in Zimbabwe before studying literature at Cambridge. He currently divides his time between the United Kingdom and Brazil, where his wife is from.

== Career ==
Taylor has written more than 60 children's books. His best known picture books including When Dinosaurs Walked the Earth (illustrated by Zehra Hicks), Hoot Owl, Master of Disguise (illustrated by Jean Jullien), When a Monster is Born (illustrated by Nick Sharratt), A Brave Bear (illustrated by Emily Hughes), and Huck Runs Amuck! (illustrated by Peter H. Reynolds). He's co-authored three illustrated nature books with ecologist Alex Morss: Winter Sleep, Busy Spring and Funny Bums, Freaky Beaks. He's also written longer fiction, including A Waste of Good Paper - a novel for teenagers set in a Pupil Referral Unit, and a number of first reading books including the Purple Class series.

Taylor's roots are in writing and performing poetry and he has written a trilogy of poetry titles for Walker Books. The first is The Dream Train - Poems for Bedtime (illustrated by Anuska Allepuz) published in 2022. The second is You're a Poet - Ways to Start Writing Poems (illustrated by Sam Usher) published in 2024. The third is the collection of finger rhymes Five Little Friends (illustrated by Fiona Woodcock).

Among several plays for young audiences written by Sean Taylor are Finding Santa produced in the UK by Little Angel Theatre and (in Portuguese) A Linha Magica and O Sonho do Jeronimo produced in Brazil by A Fabulosa Companhia.

Aside from writing, Sean Taylor has taught on three continents and runs poetry workshops in schools.

== Awards ==
In December 2007, his book When a Monster is Born, illustrated by Nick Sharratt, won a gold medal in the Nestlé Prize for works for children five years old and under. However, he turned down the prize money from the sponsor, Nestlé, because of "questions surrounding Nestlé’s marketing of breast-milk substitutes".

In January 2008, Nestlé withdrew from the 23-year-old sponsorship role of the Booktrust administrated prize for children's writing.

In August 2007 the Dutch edition of When a Monster is Born (Als er een monster is geboren) was awarded with a Pluim van de maand (Feather of the month).

Robot Rumpus, illustrated by Ross Collins, won the Scottish Book Trust Children's Book Awards in 2015.

Hoot Owl, Master of Disguise has been recognised by a number of awards, winning the 2017 Hampshire Picture Book Award and the 2018 Hong Kong Golden Dragon Book Award, and becoming an Honor Book in the 2016 Charlotte Zolotow Award.

In 2017 Where the Bugaboo Lives, an interactive choose your own adventure story illustrated by Neal Layton, won the Hampshire Illustrated Book Award and the Coventry Inspiration Book Award. It is now a Little Angel Theatre production.

In 2024 When Dinosaurs Walked the Earth won Oscar's Book Prize.

== Works ==
- Boing! (illustrated by Bruce Ingman) Candlewick Press 2004
- Purple Class and the Skelington (illustrated by Helen Bate) Frances Lincoln Children's Books 2006
- Purple Class and the Flying Spider (illustrated by Helen Bate) Frances Lincoln Children's Books 2006
- The Great Snake: Stories from the Amazon (illustrated by Fernando Vilela) Frances Lincoln Children's Books 2008
- The Bopping Big Band (illustrated by Christyan Fox) Scholastic 2008
- When a Monster is Born (ISBN 1596432543) (illustrated by Nick Sharratt) Roaring Brook Press, Macmillan Publishers 2009
- Crocodiles are the Best Animals of All! (illustrated by Hannah Shaw) Frances Lincoln Children's Books 2009
- Purple Class and the Half-Eaten Sweater (illustrated by Helen Bate) Frances Lincoln Children's Books 2009
- Tickling Tigers (illustrated by Jo Brown) Orchard 2010
- The Ring Went Zing! (illustrated by Jill Barton) Dial Press 2010
- Huck Runs Amuck! (illustrated by Peter H. Reynolds) Dial Press 2011
- The Grizzly Bear with the Frizzly Hair (illustrated by Hannah Shaw) Frances Lincoln Children's Books 2011
- The World Champion of Staying Awake (illustrated by Jimmy Liao) Walker Books 2011
- A Waste of Good Paper, Frances Lincoln Children's Books 2012
- Who Ate Auntie Iris? (illustrated by Hannah Shaw) Frances Lincoln Children's Books 2012
- Robomop (illustrated by Edel Rodriguez) Dial Press 2013
- Robot Rumpus (illustrated by Ross Collins) Andersen Press 2013
- We Have Lift-Off! (illustrated by Hannah Shaw) Frances Lincoln Children's Books 2013
- Fiddlesticks! (illustrated by Sally Garland) Simon & Schuster 2014
- That's What Makes a Hippopotamus Smile (illustrated by Laurent Cardon) Frances Lincoln Children's Books 2014
- Goal! (illustrated by Caio Vilela) Henry Holt and Company 2014
- Where the Bugaboo Lives (illustrated by Neal Layton) Walker Books 2015
- It's a Groovy World, Alfredo! (illustrated by Chris Garbutt) Walker Books 2015
- What A Naughty Bird (illustrated by Dan Widdowson) Templar Publishing 2015
- The World-Famous Cheese Shop Break-in (illustrated by Hannah Shaw) Frances Lincoln Children's Books 2015
- Hoot Owl, Master of Disguise (illustrated by Jean Jullien) Walker Books 2016
- A Brave Bear (illustrated by Emily Hughes) Walker Books 2016
- Don't Call Me Choochie Pooh! (illustrated by Kate Hindley) Walker Books 2016
- I Want to Be in a Scary Story (illustrated by Jean Jullien) Walker Books 2017
- The Snowbear (illustrated by Claire Alexander) The Quarto Group 2017
- They Came From Planet Zabalooloo! (illustrated by Kate Hindley) Walker Books 2017
- I Am Actually a Penguin (illustrated by Kasia Matyjaszek) Templar 2018
- Riding a Donkey Backwards: Wise and Foolish Tales of Mulla Nasruddin (illustrated by Shirin Adl) co-author Khayaal Theatre, Otter-Barry Books, 2018
- Winter Sleep: A Hibernation Story co-written with Alex Morss (illustrated by Cinyee Chiu) Quarto Group 2019
- Kiss the Crocodile (illustrated by Ben Mantle) Walker Books 2019
- My Mum Always Looks After Me So Much (illustrated by David Barrow) Frances Lincoln Children's Books 2019
- Humperdink Our Elephant Friend (illustrated by Claire Alexander) Quarto Group 2019
- Good Dog! (illustrated by David Barrow) Frances Lincoln Children's Books 2020
- Busy Spring: Nature Wakes Up co-written with Alex Morss (illustrated by Cinyee Chiu) Quarto Group 2021
- Funny Bums, Freaky Beaks co-written with Alex Morss (illustrated by Sarah Edmonds) Welbeck Publishing Group 2021
- How to Be Cooler Than Cool (illustrated by Jean Jullien) Walker Books 2021
- MONSTER! HUNGRY! PHONE! (Illustrated by Fred Benaglia) Bloomsbury Publishing 2022
- Wild Summer: Life in the Heat co-written with Alex Morss (illustrated by Cinyee Chiu) Quarto Group 2022
- The Dream Train - Poems for Bedtime (illustrated by Anuska Allepuz) Walker Books 2022
- MONSTER! THIRSTY! DRINK! (Illustrated by Fred Benaglia) Bloomsbury Publishing 2023
- When Dinosaurs Walked the Earth (illustrated by Zehra Hicks) Frances Lincoln Books 2023
- Natterjack Toad Can't Believe It! (illustrated by Kathryn Durst) Walker Books 2024
- You're a Poet (illustrated by Sam Usher) Walker Books 2024
- Autumn Feast: Nature's Harvest co-written with Alex Morss (illustrated by Cinyee Chiu) Quarto Group 2024
