= Hato Press =

London publishing house

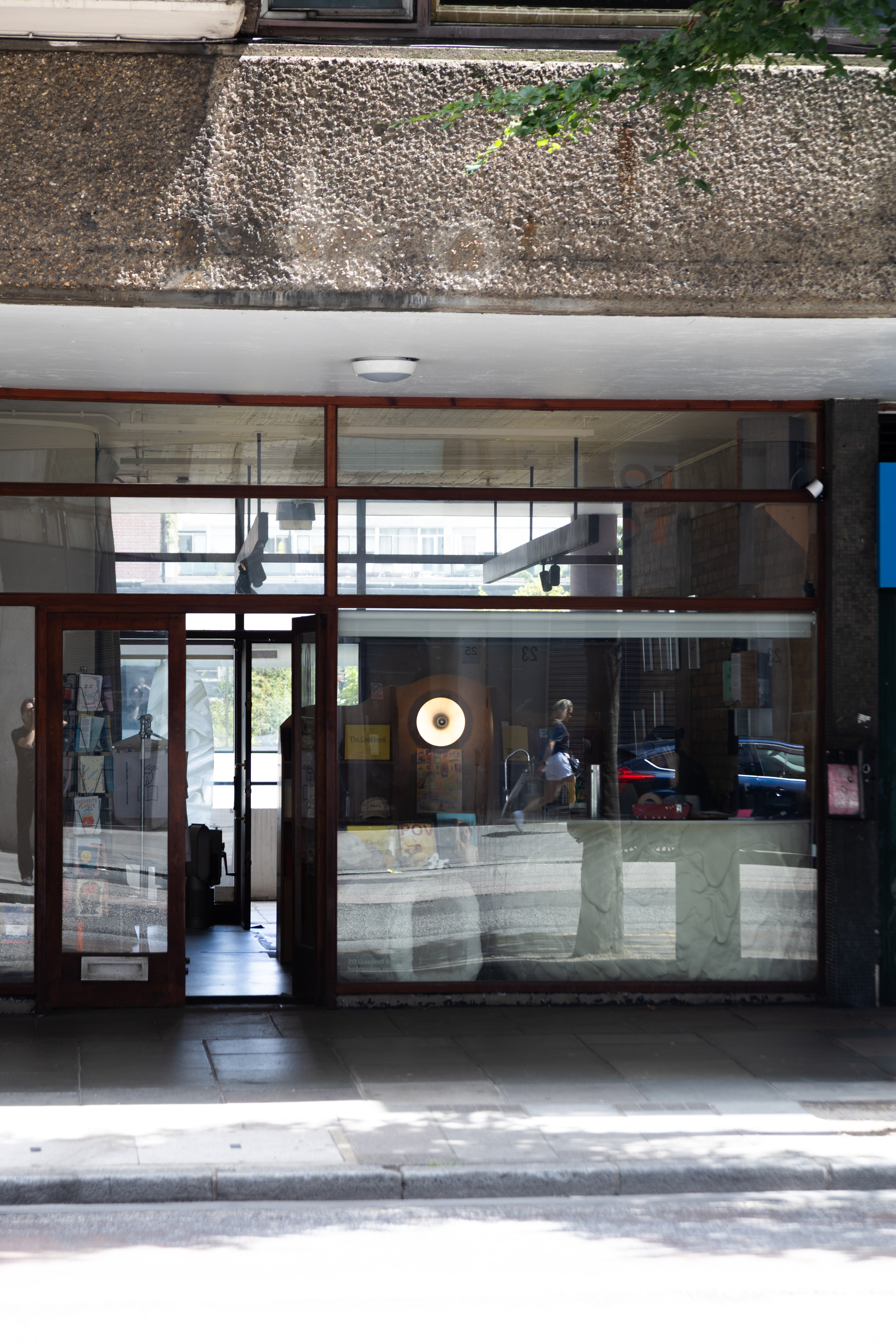
- Retail location in London in 2025
- Industry: Publishing
- Founded: 2009
- Founder: Jackson Lam; Ken Kirton

Hato Press is a publishing house based in London of the United Kingdom. It has published books by Jean Jullien and others, as well as zines by the founders of Studio Moniker. In addition to publishing zines and books, it also hosts other programming like risograph workshops and runs the design studios Hato Studio and Hato Labo.

== History ==
Hato Press was founded in 2009, by Jackson Lam and Ken Kirton, in order to make printing and production much more accessible for artists. The two had previously been at Central Saint Martins.

In 2010, Hato Press began a series called Studio Cookbook, a recipe book for "busy creatives" curated by a variety of artists sharing what they cook and eat while in their studios.

In 2015, Hato Press published Cooking With Scorsese, a book full of stills from movies where food is a central element. Several volumes have since been published, including films not just by Martin Scorsese but other directors. The series also includes a website as a companion piece. In 2021, an actual cookbook consisting of recipes by 46 international chefs was published. In 2023, after three total volumes, a larger collection, titled Cooking With Scorsese: The Collection, was published.

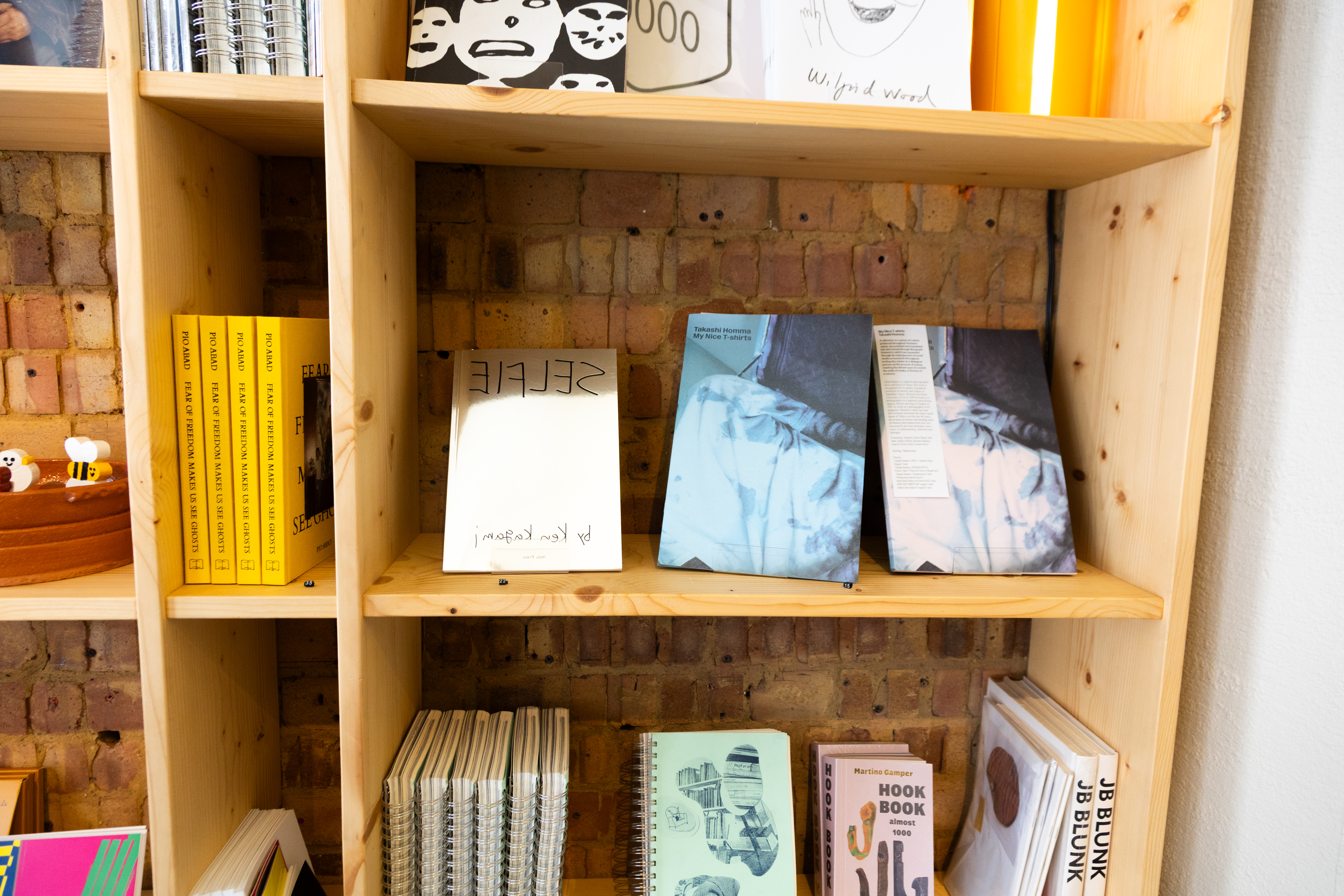
A bookshelf inside the retail location in 2025.

In 2020, Hato Press began publishing zines by artists, illustrators, writers, and photographers looking to gain more experience with risographs. They published their fiftieth zine, with photographer Takashi Homma, in 2024.

In 2022, Hato Press moved its press and studio to Golden Lane Estate in London. In August 2024, it opened a retail space nearby after having shuttered its previous store in Coal Drops Yard of King's Cross, London.
