= Hoot Owl, Master of Disguise =

Book by Sean Taylor

- Author: Sean Taylor
- Illustrator: Jean Jullien
- Language: English
- Genre: Children's picture book
- Publisher: Walker Books
- Publication date: 2014
- Publication place: United Kingdom
- ISBN: 978-0-7636-7578-3

Hoot Owl, Master of Disguise is a children's picture book by Sean Taylor, illustrated by Jean Jullien.

First published by Walker Books in 2014, it's since been translated into 6 languages and adapted into a children's theatre show. It became a Charlotte Zolotow Award Honor Book in 2016, and won the Hampshire Picture Book Award in 2017.

== Plot ==
Hoot Owl is hungry, and decides to disguise himself to catch some food. He tries a series of improvised costumes - a carrot (to catch a rabbit), and an ornamental birdbirth (to catch a pigeon). He believes, as do many young children, that costumes will make him unrecognisable. But his disguises are laughably ineffective and all fail - he is not, in fact, a master of disguise.

The comedy of the book comes from the self-important delusion of the hero, and the contrast between his puffed-up ego and his inept plans. It's been described as a parody of old fashioned suspense fiction.

Ultimately, Hoot Owl 'catches' a pizza, by disguising himself as a pizza waiter, and all is resolved.

== Publication ==
Hoot Owl, Master of Disguise was first published by Walker Books in the U.K in 2014, and subsequently by Candlewick Press in the U.S. It has been translated into 6 languages, including French and Italian.

== Adaptation ==
Hoot Owl was adapted into a show for children by Ellis Creez and Rebecca Hallworth of Proon Productions in 2018. Featuring animation, puppets, live action and numerous costume changes, it toured theatres all over the UK. Initially performed at the Stratford ArtsHouse in Stratford-upon-Avon in 2018, the show - with original songs - toured numerous theatres, from the Old Fire Station Theatre in Oxford to Bury Met in Manchester.

== Recognition ==
In 2016 it became a Charlotte Zolotow Award Honor Book, and was shortlisted for Scholastic’s inaugural Laugh Out Loud Book Awards (known as the Lollies).

In 2017 it won the Hampshire Picture Book Award. In 2018 it was awarded a Golden Dragon Book Award in Hong Kong.
