= Davide Cali =

Italian writer (born 1972)

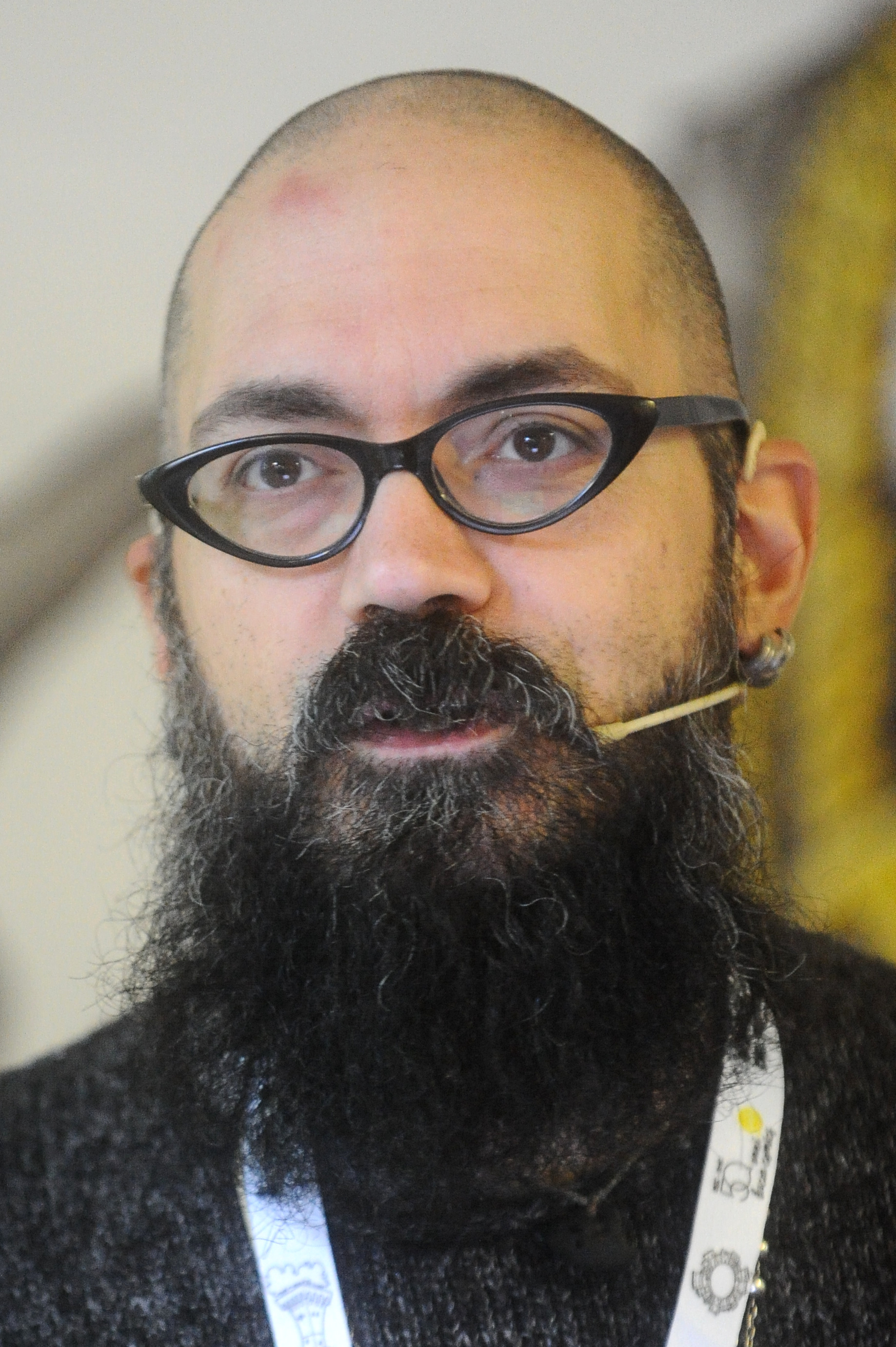
- Born: 1972 (age 53–54); Liestal, Switzerland
- Occupation: Writer
- Writing career
- Genre: Children's books

Davide Cali (born 1972) is a Swiss-born Italian writer of picture books and graphic novels, primarily for children and young adults. He lives in Italy. His work has been published in 25 countries and translated into many languages. He also writes under the pseudonyms Taro Miyazawa and Daikon.

== Biography ==
Even though he was born in Liestal, Switzerland, Davide Calì grew up in Italy where he started his career as a comic book artist working with many fanzines. In 1994 he took a job as a comics author at the iconic Italian comics magazine “Linus”. He held that position until 2008.

He started writing children's books in 1998, his first works were published in Italy. Since 2004 his books have been published in France either by Sarbacane and in the magazine “Mes premiers j'aime lire” (Bayard Editions).

Currently, his books amount to more than 90. They have been translated in over 30 languages.

Davide Calì has also taught illustration-related courses for many organisations - both in Italy and in Europe - such as IED Istituto Europeo di Design in Turin, Artielier in Padova, MiMaster in Milan and Estonian Academy of Arts in Tallinn.

He provided the idea for “Cari autori vediamoci chiaro”, a guide for those who want to become professional illustrators. It affords advice and suggestions from Davide Calì and other important Italian authors. In 2003 the book had been produced by Zoolibri/Delicatessen and given out for free.

His latest articles concerning illustration and children's books appeared on the website Frizzifrizzi and on Morena Forza's blog Robadadisegnatori. They are soon to be gathered in order to create a free-downloading guide.

He took part in a great number of exhibitions - either as an artist or a superintendent- in Paris and all around France and on the web. Many shows based on his works have been staged in France, Belgium, Italy and Japan.

Since 2016 he has been the art director at Book on a Tree, the storytelling agency that the Italian writer Pierdomenico Baccalario has founded in London, in 2014.

In 2020 it activated a series of reading promotion projects, carrying out online reading for a period. He also donated several projects free of charge to booksellers, teachers and librarians, including the Hula-Hoop Readings and Take-Away Writers (later also declined with illustrators and cartoonists).

== Works ==
=== Album ===
==== Works originally published in Italian ====
- Storia di Alfonso e del suo cane Boris, illustrated by the author, 2000
- Mi piace il cioccolato (English translation: I love chocolate), illustrated by Evelyn Daviddi, Zoolibri, 2001
- Zaccaria cane parlante e altre storie di animali, illustrated by the author, 2002
- Il gatto verde, illustrated by the author, 2002
- La collezione di biscotti, illustrated by Evelynn Daviddi, Zoolibri, 2006
- Due eroi sono troppi, illustrated by Miguel Tanco, Arka, 2006
- Voglio una mamma-robot (English translation: Mama Robot), illustrated by Anna Laura Cantone, Arka, 2007
- Quel che vorrei, illustrated by Agnese Baruzzi, Einaudi Ragazzi, 2007
- L'orso con la spada (English translation: The Bear with the Sword), illustrated by Gianluca Foli, Zoolibri, 2008
- L'isola del piccolo mostro nero-nero, illustrated by Philip Giordano, Zoolibri, 2008
- Auto-futuro, illustrated by Maurizio Santucci, Zoolibri, 2011
- Raymond il bambino a rotelle, illustrated by Simone Frasca, Emme 2011
- La prossima volta!, illustrated by Gianni Peg, Emme, 2011
- Mondo fantastico, co-authors Federica Iacobelli, Vanessa Sorrentino, illustrated by Agnese Baruzzi, Carlotta Costanzi, Massimo Ottoni, Marco Paci, 2011
- Signor Alce, illustrated by Sara Welponer, Emme, 2012
- Io, Qinuq, illustrated by Leire Salaberria, Kite Edizioni, 2013
- Mio papà, il grande pirata, illustrated by Maurizio Quarello, Orecchio Acerbo, 2013
- Polline – Una storia d'amore, illustrated by Monica Barengo, Kite Edizioni, 2013
- Pum, Pum!, illustrated by Maddalena Gerli, Zoolibri, 2014
- Quando un elefante si innamora, illustrated by Alice Lotti, Kite Edizioni, 2014
- Un giorno, senza un perché, illustrated by Monica Barengo, Kite Edizioni, 2014
- Biancaneve e i 77 nani, illustrated by Raphaëlle Barbanègre, EDT Giralangolo, 2016
- La rapina del secolo, illustrated by the author, Biancoenero Edizioni, 2016
- La casa di riposo dei supereroi, illustrated by the author, Biancoenero Edizioni, 2016
- Il richiamo della palude, illustrated by Marco Somà, Kite Edizioni, 2016
- Inaugurazione del Poseidon, illustrated by Noemi Vola, Biancoenero Edizioni, 2017
- Quando un elefante mette su casa, illustrated by Alice Lotti, Kite Edizioni, 2017
- La dieta del pugile, illustrated by Noemi Vola, Biancoenero Edizioni, 2017
- Gianni Ginocchio e il segreto inconfessabile, illustrated by Laura Re, Lapis Edizioni, 2017
- Atlante dei Luoghi Immaginari, co-written by Pierdomenico Baccalario, illustrated by Isabella Mazzanti, Mondadori, 2017
- Mio nonno gigante, illustrated by Bruno Zocca, Biancoenero Edizioni, 2018
- L’orso che non aveva mai voglia di fare nulla, illustrated by Lali Limola, Eli Readers, 2018
- Il venditore di felicità, illustrated by Marco Somà, Kite Edizioni, 2018
- Tre in tutto, illustrated by Isabella Labate, Orecchio Acerbo, 2018
- Il perché degli spinaci, illustrated by Andrea Rivola, DeAgostini, 2018
- L’accademia dei supereroi, illustrated by the author, Biancoenero Edizioni, 2018
- Lo scrittore, illustrated by Monica Barengo, Kite Edizioni, 2019
- Dicono di me, illustrated by Marianna Balducci, Hop Edizioni, 2019
- Carlo Cucito e la fiera del fumetto, illustrated by Laura Re, Lapis Edizioni, 2019
- Ora o mai più, illustrated by Cecilia Ferri, Kite Edizioni, 2020
- Fino in fondo, illustrated by Anna Aparicio Català, Kite Edizioni, 2020
- Un tempo per ogni cosa, illustrated by Isabella Labate, Kite Edizioni, 2020
- La gita dei supereroi, illustrated by Alice Piaggio, Biancoenero Edizioni, 2020
- Una storia senza cliché, illustrated by Anna Aparicio Català, Clichy Edizioni, 2021
- Settecani, illustrated by Alice Piaggio, Clichy Edizioni, 2021
- L'isola delle ombre, illustrated by Claudia Palmarucci, Orecchio Acerbo, 2021
- I supereroi e lo sciopero della minestrina, illustrated by Alice Piaggio, Biancoenero Edizioni, 2021
- Signor Alce, illustrated by Richolly Rosazza, Kite Edizioni, 2021
- Quando sarò grande, illustrated by Giulia Pastorino, Clichy Edizioni, 2021
- Troppi conigli, illustrated by Emanuele Benedetti, Kite Edizioni, 2021
- Plenilunio, illustrated by Loputyn, Hop Edizioni, 2021
- La principessa dei pony-unicorno, illustrated by Anna Aparicio Català, Clichy, 2022
- Salta!, illustrated by Adalgisa Masella, Kite, 2022
- E vissero felici e contenti, illustrated by Naida Mazzenga, Clichy, 2022
- L’album dei ricordi dei supereroi, illustrated by the author, Biancoenero, 2022
- Osso, Pelliccia e Zucca non fanno paura a nessuno, illustrated by Stefano Martinuz, Nomos, 2022
- Colpa di chi?, illustrated by Regina Lukk-Toompere, Kite, 2022
- Il Grande Bubba, illustrated by Barroux, Edizioni Clichy, 2022
- Hey, laggiù! Basta così!, illustrated by Giulia Pastorino, Clichy, 2023
- Melasse, illustrated by Anna Aparicio Català, Clichy, 2023
- La grande guerra dei supereroi, illustrated by the author, Biancoenero, 2023
- Giorgio mostro timido, illustrated by Stefano Martinuz, Nomos, 2023
- Rododendro, illustrated by Marco Paschetta, Kite Edizioni, 2023
- Tutto questo un giorno sarà tuo, illustrated by Sara Arosio, Scienza Express, 2023
- La principessa nasona, illustrated by Marianna Balducci, Clichy edizioni, 2024
- Signor Alce – 2, illustrated by Richolly Rosazza, Kite Edizioni, 2024
- A volte, ancora, illustrated by Monica Barengo, Kite Edizioni, 2024
- Cavalca la tigre, illustrated by Guridi, Kite Edizioni, 2024

==== Works originally published in Italian (Switzerland) ====
- La casa degli uccelli, illustrated by Tiziana Romanin, Marameo Edizioni, 2019

==== Works originally published in French ====
- Un papa sur mesure, (English translation: A Dad Who Measures Up), illustrated by Anna Laura Cantone, Sarbacane, 2004
- Juste a ce moment-là, illustrated by José Saraiva, Sarbacane, 2004
- Piano Piano, (English translation: Piano Piano), illustrated by Éric Heliot, Sarbacane, 2005
- Bernard et moi, illustrated by Éric Heliot, Sarbacane, 2005
- Moi, j'attends, (English translation: I Can't Wait), illustrated by Serge Bloch, Sarbacane, 2005
- La vie de chapeau, illustrated by Éric Heliot, Sarbacane, 2006
- Si je fusse une grenouille, illustrated by Benedicte Guettier, Sarbacane, 2006
- L'ennemi, (English translation: The Enemy), illustrated by Serge Bloch, Sarbacane, 2007
- Leopold, Chien de divan, illustrated by Camille Jourdy, Sarbacane, 2008
- J'aime t'embrasser, (English translation: I Love Kissing You), illustrated by Serge Bloch, Sarbacane, 2008
- La revanche des aubergines, illustrated by Éric Héliot, Sarbacane, 2009
- Marlène Baleine, illustrated by Sonja Bougaeva, Sarbacane, 2009
- C'est quoi l'amour?, (English translation: What Is This Thing Called Love?), illustrated by Anna Laura Cantone, Sarbacane, 2011
- Monstres et légendes, (English translation: Monsters & Legends: Cyclops, Krakens, Mermaids and Other Imaginary Creatures That Really Existed!), illustrated by Gabriella Giandelli, Actes Sud Junior, 2011
- Coccinelles cherchent maison, (English translation:The Great House Hunt), illustrated by Marc Boutavant, Sarbacane, 2011
- Quand je ferme les jeux ..., illustrated by Robin, Sarbacane, 2011
- 10 petits tanks s’en vont en guerre, (English translation: 10 tanks were going to the war), illustrated by the author, Editions Thierry Magnier, 2012
- Petit Inuit, (English translation: The Little Eskimo), illustrated by Maurizio Quarello, Sarbacane, 2012
- Bons baisers ratés de Paris, illustrated by Anne Rouquette, Gulf Stream, 2012
- Paris 2050, illustrated by Ale+Ale, Actes Sud, 2012
- Tendres bêtises à faire quand on est amoureux, illustrated by Robin, Sarbacane, 2013
- Un week-end de repos absolu, illustrated by Alexandra Huard, Sarbacane, 2013
- Les jours hibou, illustrated by Vincent Mathy, Sarbacane, 2013
- Le grand livre de la bagarre, illustrated by Serge Bloch, Sarbacane, 2013
- Elle est où la ligne, illustrated by Joelle Jolivet, Trimestre / Oskar, 2014
- Bons baisers ratés de Venise, illustrated by Isabella Mazzanti, Gulf Stream, 2014
- Vide-grenier, illustrated by Marie Dorleans, Sarbacane, 2014
- Le perroquet de l’Empereur, illustrated by Chiaki Miyamoto, Nobi-Nobi, 2014
- Il était trois fois: les trois petits cochons , illustrated by Roland Garrigue, Nathan, 2015
- Bons baisers ratés de New York , illustrated by Raphaëlle Barbanègre, Gulf Stream, 2015
- Chez moi, illustred by Sébastien Mourrain, Actes Sud, 2016
- Les Bacon Brothers: retour en Amérique!, illustrated by Ronan Badel, ABC Melody, 2016
- Crotte!, illustrated by Christine Roussey, Nathan, 2016
- Cours!, illustrated by Maurizio Quarello, Sarbacane, 2016
- Bronto-stégo-mégalo-saurus, illustrated by Sebastien Mourrain, Sarbacane, 2017
- Eléctrico 28, illustrated by Magali Lehuche ABC Melody, 2017
- Cornelius Holmes /1: Le caniche des Baskerville, illustrated by Océane Meklemberg, La Palissade, 2017
- La souris qui voulait faire une omelette, illustrated by Maria Dek, Helium, 2017
- Les amoureux, illustrated by Roland Garrigue, Sarbacane, 2018
- A chaque pied sa chaussure, illustrated by Cecilia Campironi, Cambourakis, 2018
- C’est le chat, illustrated by Magali Clavelet, Gallimard, 2018
- Monsieur Tomate, prof. de maths, illustrated by Popy Matigot, Sarbacane, 2018
- Il était trois fois: La belle au bois dormant, illustrated by Amélie Falière, Nathan, 2018
- Qui veut jouer avec moi?, illustrated by the author, Sarbacane, 2018
- Mon premier jour de classe, illustrated by Amélie Groux, Little Urban, 2018
- Top-car, illustrated by Sébastien Mourrain, Editions des éléphants, 2018
- Bimbim est très en colère, illustrated by Michiko Chapuis, Rue du Monde, 2018
- Bimbim veut qu’on lui obéisse, illustrated by Michiko Chapuis, Rue du Monde, 2018
- La Chanson perdue de Lola Pearl, illustrated by Ronan Badel, L'Élan vert, 2018
- Les Cacacrotte: le barbecue, illustrated by Laure du Fay, Amaterra, 2018
- Les Cacacrotte: le musée, illustrated by Laure du Fay, Amaterra, 2018
- 4998 amis, illustrated by Michiko Chapuis, Rue du Monde, 2018
- Mon premier (vrai?) baiser?, illustrated by Amélie Groux, Little Urban, 2019
- Poussin, illustrated by Davide Merveille, Sarbacane, 2019
- Les jours des baleines, (as Cornelius), illustrated by Tommaso Carozzi, Editions Chocolat! Jeunesse, 2019
- Tyranno-petite-soeur, illustrated by Sébastien Mourrain, Sarbacane, 2019
- Mon premier démi-frère, illustrated by Amélie Groux, Little Urban, 2019
- Où finit le monde?, illustrated by Maria Dek, Hélium, 2020
- On nous appelait les mouches, illustrated by Maurizio Quarello, Sarbacane Editions, 2020
- Odette fait des claquettes, illustrated by Clothilde Delacroix, Sarbacane, 2020
- M. Tigre le magnifique, illustrated by Miguel Tanco, Gallimard Jeunesse Giboulées, 2020
- Votez le loup, illustrated by Magali Clavelet, Casterman, 2021
- Grands, méchants et pas contents, illustrated by Maurèen Poignonec, ABC Melody, 2021
- Drôle de nuage, illustrated by Sara Cunha, Bayard Jeunesse, 2021
- Un léger goût de mangue, illustrated by Marco Somà, Sarbacane, 2022
- Bronto-mytho-papi, illustrated by Sébastien Mourrain, Sarbacane, 2022
- En me proménant avec Kiki, illustrated by Paolo Domeniconi, Cambourakis, 2022
- Mon petit papa, illustrated by Jean Jullien, Sarbacane, 2022
- Une bibliothèque à trois roues, illustrated by Sébastien Pelon, ABC Melody, 2022
- Vampire un jour, vampire toujours, illustrated by Sébastien Mourrain, Actes Sud, 2022
- 186 - Une histoire trop courte, illustrated by Marianna Balducci, Tundra Books, 2022
- Pas pour les éléphants, illustrated by Giulia Pastorino, Sarbacane, 2023
- À l’aventure, illustrated by Daniela Costa, Sarbacane, 2023
- Osho Babanesh, illustrated by Lionel Tarchala, Editions des Éléphants, 2024
- Salomé, poule chocolatière, illustrated by Anna Aparicio Català, ABC Mélody, 2024
- Douglas je n’ai plus de croquettes!, illustrated by Magali Clavelet, Bayard, 2024
- Théophile le bibliophile, illustrated by Lorenzo Sangiò, ABC Mélody, 2024
- L’héritage des pierres, illustrated by Alphonse Bardou-Jacquet, Sarbacane, 2024

==== Works originally published in French (Canada) ====
- Petit pois, illustrated by Sébastien Mourrain, Comme des géants, 2016
- Le grand voyage de Petit Pois, illustrated by Sébastien Mourrain, Comme des Géants, 2017
- L'école de dessin de Petit Pois, illustrated by Sébastien Mourrain, Comme des géants, 2021

==== Works originally published in French (Belgium) ====
- Tourmaline, illustrated by Fatinha Ramos, De Eenhoorn, 2020

==== Works originally published in German ====
- Die Geschichte der Roten Nasen und der Roten Ohren, illustrated by Aurélie Guillerey, Annette Betz, 2007
- Omas unglaubliche Reise, illustrated by Anna Laura Cantone, Annette Betz, 2008

==== Works originally published in Spanish (Argentina) ====
- Spaghetti, illustrated by the author, Pequeño Editor, 2008

==== Works originally published in Spanish ====
- Poseando con Kiki, illustrated by Paolo Domeniconi, Fragatina, 2018
- Hugo no puede dormir, illustrated by Anna Aparicio Català, Nube Ocho, 2020
- ¡Abajo Leroy!, illustrated by Guridi, Tres Tigres Tristes, 2021
- Superheroínas e superheroes - Manual de instrucións, illustrated by Gomez, Nube Ocho, 2022

==== Works originally published in Portuguese ====
- Um dia, um guarda-chuva, illustrated by Valerio Vidali, Planeta Tangerina, 2011
- A rainha das rãs não pode molhar os pés, illustrated by Marco Somà, Bruàa, 2012
- Arturo, photos by Ninamasina, Bruàa, 2012
- A casa que voou , illustrated by Catarina Sobral, Bruàa, 2015
- Pergunta ao teu pai, illustrated by Noemi Vola, Bruàa, 2019

==== Works originally published in English (USA) ====
- I didn’t do my homeworks because, illustrated by Benjamin Chaud, Chronicle Books, 2014
- A funny thing happened on the way to school, illustrated by Benjamin Chaud, Chronicle Books, 2015
- The truth about my unbelievable summer, illustrated by Benjamin Chaud, Chronicle Books, 2016
- The Bacon Brothers: Back in the USA!, illustrated by Ronan Badel, ABC Melody, 2016
- A funny thing happened at the museum, illustrated by Benjamin Chaud, Chronicle Books, 2017
- George and the shadow, illustrated by Serge Bloch, Harper and Collins, 2017
- The truth about my unbelievable school, illustrated by Benjamin Chaud, Chronicle Books, 2018
- I hate my cats, illustrated by Anna Pirolli, Chronicle Books, 2018
- Good Morning, Neighbor, illustrated by Maria Dek, Princeton Architectural Press, 2018
- Grown-ups never do that, illustrated by Benjamin Chaud, Chronicle Books, 2019
- Where the World Ends, illustrated by Maria Dek, Princeton Architectural Press, 2020
- A funny thing happened after school, illustrato da Benjamin Chaud, Chronicle Books, 2023

==== Works originally published in English (Canada) ====
- Snow White and the 77 dwarfs, illustrated by Raphaëlle Barbanègre, Tundra Books, 2015
- Cinderella and the furry slippers, illustrated by Raphaëlle Barbanègre, Tundra Books, 2017
- A great dog, illustrated by Miguel Tanco, Tundra Books, 2018

==== Works originally published in English (UK) ====
- The Birthday Crown , illustrated by Kate Slater, Royal Collection, 2016

==== Works published in korean ====
- 아무것도 하고 싶지 않은 곰, illustrated by Lalalimola, Namumalmi, 2022
- LEOPOLDA 레오폴다?, illustrated by Gloria Di Bella, Namumalmi, 2024

=== Comics & graphic novels for adults ===
- Adam et Eve: le Paradis perdure, illustrated by Yannick Robert, Varoum, 2014
- Tutte le ossessioni di Victor, illustrated by Squaz (Pasquale Todisco), Diàbolo, 2015
- Maschi da evitare, illustrated by Veronica "Veci" Carratello, Hop! Edizioni, 2018

=== Comics & graphic novels for children ===
- Le costume de Père Noël, (English translation: Santa's Suit), illustrated by Éric Heliot, 2005 (France)
- Pas de crotte pour moi, illustrated by David De Thuin, 2006 (France)
- Il faut sauver le sapin Marcel, illustrated by Clothilde Perrin, 2008 (France)
- Jérôme et les formis rouges, illustrated by Juliette Boulard, 2010 (France)
- Mission Kraken! Les aventures de l'intrépide équipe O.C.E.A.N., illustrated by Vincent Bourgeau, 2011 (France)
- Super Potamo, illustrated by Raphaëlle Barbanègre, September 2013 (Spain)
- London Mystery Club (Book 1): Le loup-garou de Hyde Park, ABC Mélody (France), 2016
- Les ravencroft (Book 1): chaque chose à sa place, illustrated by Valentina Brancati, Kramiek (Switzerland), 2018
- London Mystery Club (Book 2): a mummy on the tube, illustrated by Yannick Robert, ABC Melody, 2018

==== The series of 10 Petits Insectes (France) ====
- 10 petits insectes (Book 1), (English translation: 10 Little Insects), illustrated by Vincent Pianina, 2009
- 10 petits insects dans le brouillard (Book 2), illustrated by Vincent Pianina, 2011
- 10 petits insectes. Retour vers le passé (Book 3), illustrated by Vincent Pianina, 2013

==== The series of Cruelle Joëlle (France) ====
- Cruelle Joëlle: la vie n'est pas si simple, Madame Mort! (Book 1), illustrated by Ninie, Sarbacane, 2010
- Cruelle Joëlle: week-end frisson au lac crystal! (Book 2), illustrated by Ninie, Sarbacane, 2012
- Cruelle Joëlle: une journee d'enfer (Book 3), illustrated by Ninie, Sarbacane, 2013

=== Novels ===
==== Works originally published in French ====
- L'amour? C'est mathématique!, Sarbacane, 2013
- 3 tyrans + 1 bolosse = quelle vie!, Sarbacane, 2014
- Elle est où la ligne, illustrated by Joelle Jolivet, Trimestre / Oskar, 2015

==== Works originally published in Italian ====
- La linea che separa le cose, illustrated by Alessandro Baronciani, Mondadori, 2022
- I bambini di Baltimore House, illustrated by Riccardo Renzi, Pelledoca, 2022

==== Adults novels ====
- Feeling bed, illustrated by Virginia Mori, Hop Edizioni, 2020

=== APP ===
- A ciascuno il suo, developed by: Paramecio Studio, Kite Edizioni, 2012
- Moi, j’attends, developed by: France Televisions Distribution SA,© Les films d'ici 2, la Station Animation, les éditions Sarbacane, 2013

=== Multimedia ===
- Pandaroux, Lunii, 2019
- Les jours hibou, illustrated by Vincent Mathy, Piboco, 2019

=== Puzzle Tales ===
- Tre etti di pane, illustrated by Marco Somà, Hop Edizioni, 2022
- Bacio, non bacio, illustrated by Monica Barengo, Hop Edizioni, 2023

=== Board games ===
- Crossroads, with Elisabetta Maria Zocca, Ludic, 2022
- Non ti fidare, with Elisabetta Zocca, Ludic, 2023
- Sali, scendi, cambia colore, with Elisabetta Zocca, Ludic, 2024

=== Translations ===
- Pour aimer son tigre, A2Mimo, 2019

== Theatre Adaptations ==
- Moi, j’attends, Compagnie O’Navio Théâtre, 2010 (Limoges, France)
- L’ennemi, Compagnie Art tout Chaud, 2010 (Amiens, France)
- L’ennemi, MicMac Théâtre, 2010 (Belgique)
- Pouce! (from L'Ennemi), Compagnie Marche ou rêve, 2010 (Toulouse, France)
- Mon Père le grand pirate, Compagnie Marche ou rêve, 2014 (Toulouse, France)
- Duplex, (from Le double + Elle est où la ligne?), Compagnie Théâtre de l’Éclaircie, 2019 (Dijon, France)

== Awards ==
- Eurochocolate Award, Italy, 2001
- Prix Libbylit, best album Moi, j’attends, Salon du Livre de Jeunesse de Namur, Belgium, 2005
- Prix Baobab, best album Moi, j’attends, Salon du livre de Jeunesse de Montreuil, France, 2005
- Premio Words and Music, Menzione speciale per Piano piano, Fiera di Bologna, Italy, 2006
- Prix Suisse Enfantaisies, Piano piano, Losanna, Switzerland, 2006
- Prix SNCF, Moi, j’attends, Festival du livre de jeunesse de Rouen, France, 2006
- Selezione White Ravens, Voglio una mamma robot, Germany, 2008
- Selezione White Ravens, L’orso con la spada, Germany, 2009
- Selezione CJ Picture Book Awards, L’orso con la spada, Korea, 2009
- Prix Bernard Versele, L’Ennemi, Brussels, Belgium, 2009
- Chinatimes, Best Album for Kids, L’Ennemi, Taiwan, 2009
- Selection Notable Social Studies Trade Books for Young People, The Enemy, USA, 2010
- Selection White Ravens, Marlène Baleine, Germany, 2011
- Primer Libro Kirico, Malena Ballena, Spain, 2011
- Prix littéraire du cycle 2 de la médiathèque de Bagneux, Marlène Baleine, France, 2011
- Prix des Bulles de Haute des Garonne, 10 Petits Insectes, France, 2011
- Prix littéraire de Plessis Robinson, L’Ennemi, France, 2011
- Prix Tam Tam, 10 Petits Insectes, La Courneuve, France, 2011
- Prix Tatoulu, Marlène Baleine, France, 2011
- Prix des Incorruptibles, Marlène Baleine, France, 2011
- Selection CJ Picture Book Awards, Um dia un guarda-chuva, Korea, 2011
- Prix DLire Canalblog, Cruelle Joëlle, France, 2011
- Prix Bulles en Haute Garonne, Jerôme et les Fourmis rouges, 2012
- Prix de la bande dessinée jeunesse de Montreuil-Bellay, Cruelle Joëlle, France, 2012
- Prix Littéraire des écoles de Châtenay-Malabry, Marlène Baleine, France, 2012
- Prix des ados, Salon du Livre Midi-Pyrénées, L’amour? C’est mathématique! France, 2014
- Premio Cassa di Risparmio di Cento, Mio padre, il grande pirata, Italy, 2014
- Premio Orbil, Mio padre, il grande pirata, Italia, 2014
- Prix du Livre jeunesse Marseille, Le grand livre de la bagarre, France, 2014
- Selezione White Ravens, Quando un elefante si innamora, Germany, 2014
- Premio Il gigante delle Langhe, La regina delle rane, Italy, 2015
- Prix des enfants Salon de Saint-Orens, Elle où la ligne?, 2015
- Premio Soligatto (sezione 8-11 anni), Mio padre, il grande pirata, Italy, 2015
- Prix Bernard Versele, L’amour? C’est Mathématique!, Belgium, 2015
- Prix de la foire de Wroclaw, L’Ennemi, Poland, 2015
- Prix Boscarato, Miglior Sceneggiatura, Tutte le ossessioni di Victor, Italy, 2015
- Prix Laura Orvieto, Mio padre, il grande pirata, Italy, 2015
- Prix Bernard Versele, L’amour ? C’est mathématique !, Belgique, 2015
- Prix Soligatto, Sono arrivato in ritardo a scuola perché, Italy, 2016
- Prix Festival du livre Jeunesse de Annemasse, Selection Lecteurs Juniors, L'amour c’est mathématique!, France, 2016
- Prix Michel Tournier Jeunesse (Catégorie Cadet), Les Bacon Brothers, France, 2018
- Prix Michel Tournier Jeunesse (Catégorie Cadet), Les Bacon Brothers, France, 2018
- Prix Littéraire de la Citoyenneté (cycle 3), Cours!, France, 2018
- Prix Alizé (Niveau 6e-5e) bibliothèques de Vienne, Cours!, France, 2018
- Prix Nénuphar de l’album jeunesse, Cours!, France, 2018
- Prix Chronos Vacances, Eléctrico 28, France, 2018
- Prix Kilitou, Eléctrico 28, France, 2018
- Premio Orbil, Tre in tutto, Italy, 2019
- Prix des Petits Caractères, Poussin, France, 2019
- Premio Legambiente, Tre in tutto, Italy, 2019
- Prix Danielle Grondein (Prix Spécial du jury), Journées du livre jeunesse de la ville Les Pennes-Mirabeau, La chanson perdue de Lola Pearl, France, 2019
- Prix Enfantaisie, Poussin, Switzerland, 2020
- Premio Torre del Agua, Il venditore di Felicità, Spain, 2021
- Premio Kimi Siegel, Il venditore di Felicità, Germany, 2021
- Finaliste Prix des libraires du Québec - catégorie Hors Québec - Jeunesse, M. Tigre le magnifique, avec Miguel Tanco, 2022
- Sélection Prix Sorcières, Catégorie Carrément sorcières fiction, Le Cauchemar du Thylacine, avec Claudia Palmarucci, 2022
- Premio Luigi Malerba, Quando sarò grande, Italy, 2022
- Prix Versele, Les adultes ne font jamais ça, Belgio, 2022
- Best Illustrated Children Book, The writer, USA, 2022
