= Edel Rodriguez =

Cuban-American painter

- Born: August 22, 1971 (age 55); Havana, Cuba
- Education: Pratt Institute (BFA); Hunter College (MFA)
- Known for: illustration, fine artist

Edel Rodriguez (born August 22, 1971, in Havana, Cuba) is a Cuban American artist, illustrator, and children's book author. Using a variety of materials, his work ranges from conceptual to portraiture and landscape. Socialist propaganda and western advertising, island culture, and contemporary city life, are all aspects of his life that inform his work.

== Early life and education ==
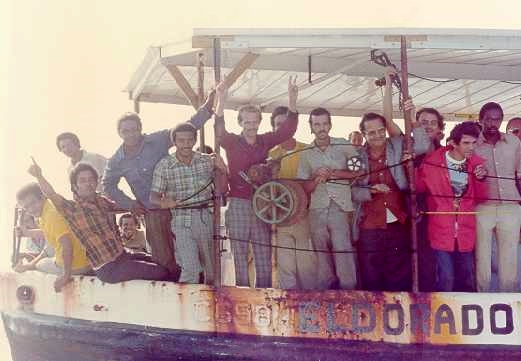
Rodriguez arrived in the United States during the Mariel boatlift crisis, 1980.

Until the age of 9, Rodriguez lived in the Cuban countryside town of El Gabriel. In an interview conducted by Yuko Shimizu, Rodriguez described his earliest visual influences as military, revolutionary and nationalist imagery. In 1980, Rodriguez emigrated to the United States with his father, Cesareo Rodriguez, his mother, Coralia Rodriguez, and his sister Irma, as part of the thousands of Cubans who arrived in the Mariel boatlift. His family arrived in Key West and since the Cuban government had taken possession of the family's home, car, furniture, and clothes, the Rodriguez family had little to start a new life with. The family moved in with relatives in Miami, Florida where Edel's father established a trucking business. Within a couple of years of arriving in the US, Rodriguez had mastered the language to the point that he became a Spelling Bee champion. Rodriguez graduated from Hialeah-Miami Lakes High School in 1990.

After graduation from high school, Rodriguez attended Pratt Institute in Brooklyn, New York. While a student at Pratt, Rodriguez interned at Spy magazine, MTV and Penguin Books. After graduating from Pratt with honors and earning a BFA in painting on a full scholarship, Rodriguez went on to earn a M.F.A. from Hunter College in 1998.

In 1991, Rodriguez met Jennifer Roth; the two married in 1997.

== Work ==
In 1994 Rodriguez began work as an art director for Time magazine. At 26, Rodriguez was the youngest art director to ever work on Time's Canadian and Latin American editions. He held this position until 2008, when he began dedicating all of his time to art and commercial illustration. While working at Time, Rodriguez produced a significant amount of illustration work, the majority of which was done in the evenings. Some of the more memorable commercial works produced during this period were his June 27, 2005 Time magazine cover for China's New Revolution in which Mao Zedong is depicted wearing Louis Vuitton, and his May/June 2006 cover for Communication Arts depicting Che Guevara wearing a Nike logo and Apple headphones. The Time cover depicting Mao Zedong was later used in 2009 as the cover for Lürzer's 200 Best Illustrators Worldwide.

Throughout his career, Rodriguez has utilized a variety of artistic media including paint, printmaking, pastel, line drawing as well as digital manipulation.

Rodriguez' work has been published by magazines such as The New Yorker, Time, Rolling Stone, Fortune and others. Rodriguez' work has also been used by corporate clients such as MTV, Pepsi Inc and others. Rodriguez' work also appears regularly on the Op-Ed page of The New York Times.

In 2005, the U.S. Postal Service released the Cha-Cha-Cha stamp, illustrated by Rodriguez.

=== In the news ===
For the 2015 February 8 issue of Newsweek, the cover story by Nina Burleigh was illustrated by Rodriguez. The cover image, portraying a woman with her skirt being lifted up by a computer cursor created controversy, with some calling it a faceless and sexualized symbol of women. The cover image also created what NBC News described as a "firestorm" on Twitter, after the website Jezebel derided the illustration. Burleigh, who wrote the cover story, described the critical comments as petty. On PBS, Rodriguez defended the work saying "it’s not sexist, it depicts the ugliness of sexism".

For the August 22, 2016, issue of Time, editor-in-chief Nancy Gibbs focused their cover on Republican Donald Trump's presidential campaign, with the cover title Meltdown. DW Pine commissioned Rodriguez for the cover illustration. The cover appeared on various news broadcasts, including PBS and MSNBC, as well as generating news coverage in such magazines and newspapers as The Washington Post and People.

For the February 4, 2017, issue of Der Spiegel, Rodriguez's cover image depicting President Donald Trump holding the Statue of Liberty's severed head in one hand and a knife in the other, with the cover title America First generated news coverage in such publications as The Washington Post, The Guardian, Newsweek and other news outlets. The cover image was described as tasteless by vice-president of the European Parliament, Alexander Graf Lambsdorff and defended by Der Spiegel editor-in-chief Klaus Brinkbaeumer, who commented that he was surprised by the impact of the illustration.

The August 28th, 2017 issue of Time, titled Hate in America, focused on a rally in Charlottesville, Virginia, that resulted in the death of 2 police officers and a 32-year-old woman. Illustrated by Rodriguez, the cover art, depicting a protester giving a Nazi salute while draped in an American flag was covered in the news by CNN and Market Watch.

In early 2018, Rodriguez met U2's stage designer, Es Devlin, at the Design Indaba Conference in Cape Town, South Africa. An upcoming U2 tour, eXPERIENCE + iNNOCENCE, was still being developed at that time and Rodriguez was brought in to create 40 works of art that would be shown prominently during the pre-show and prior to the second act of the performance. His illustrations incorporated text from the Declaration of Independence and the U.S. Constitution, with texts such as "When the government becomes destructive it is the right of the people to abolish it" and slogans such as "Poverty Is Sexist" and "Educate a girl, empower a community." Works produced for this event also covered social issues such as immigration, gun violence, and free speech with signs that read, "Refugees Welcome", and "Fight Back!".

=== Theatrical posters ===
- Macbeth by William Shakespeare with Kelsey Grammer at the Music Box Theatre (2000)
- Salt Water Moon by David French at the SoulPepper Theatre (2008)
- The Odd Couple by Neil Simon at the SoulPepper Theatre (2008)
- Cyrano de Bergerac with Kevin Kline at the Richard Rodgers Theatre, 2008
- As You Like It by William Shakespeare at the SoulPepper Theatre, 2010
- Norma by Vincenzo Bellini, Canadian Opera Company
- Madama Butterfly by Giacomo Puccini, Canadian Opera Company (2009)
- Nixon in China by John Adams, Canadian Opera Company (2011)

=== Film posters ===
- Celia the Queen directed by Joe Cardona, Mario de Varona (2008), with Celia Cruz, David Byrne, Wyclef Jean, Quincy Jones, Narciso Rodriguez
- Heaven on Earth directed by Deepa Mehta, (2008), starring Preity Zinta
- Reportero directed by Bernardo Ruiz
- The Graduates/Los Graduados PBS documentary directed by Bernardo Ruiz (2013)
- The Tragedy of Macbeth directed by Joel Coen (2021)

=== Book covers ===
- Things Fall Apart by Chinua Achebe (50th Anniversary Edition, 2008)
- The House on Mango Street by Sandra Cisneros (25th Anniversary Edition, 2009)
- In The Sea There are Crocodiles by Fabio Geda
- Illustrators 51 published by the Society of Illustrators (2010)

=== Children's book illustrator ===
- Mama Does the Mambo by Katherine Leiner (2001) (ISBN 0-7868-0646-X)
- Float Like a Butterfly by Ntozake Shange (2002) (ISBN 0786805544)
- Oye, Celia! by Katie Sciurba (2007) (ISBN 0805074686)
- Sonia Sotomayor by Jonah Winter (2009) (ISBN 9781442403031)
- Robomop by Sean Taylor (2013) (ISBN 9780803734111)

=== Children's book author and illustrator ===
- Sergio Makes a Splash (2008) (ISBN 9780316066167)
- Sergio Saves The Game (2009) (ISBN 9780316066174)

=== Art exhibitions ===
- Dystopia, solo exhibition at Curly Tale Fine Art, Chicago, 2013
- Here | There, solo exhibition at Gallery Nucleus, 2010
- Curator Power Pens: The Art of Politics, Society of Illustrators (2008)

== Awards and honors ==
- Named one of 50 Most Creative People of the Year, 2016, by AdAge
- Best Cover Winner, American Society of Magazine Editors, 2016
- Gold Medal, (Book) Society of Illustrators 2012, Krapus, BLAB SHOW, art directed by Monte Beauchamp
- Silver Medal, Advertising Society of Illustrators 2011
- Silver Medal(Book), 2009 Society of Illustrators, Things Fall Apart, Random House, art directed by Helen Yentus
- Silver Medal (Advertising), 2009, Society of Illustrators, As You Like It, Soulpepper Theatre, art directed by Anthony Swaneveld
- Bronze Cube, Art Directors Club (2011)
