= When a Monster Is Born =

2006 children's book by Sean Taylor

When a Monster is Born
- Author: Sean Taylor
- Illustrator: Nick Sharratt
- Language: English
- Genre: Children's
- Publisher: Orchard Books
- Publication date: 5 October 2006
- Publication place: United Kingdom
- Pages: 32 pp
- ISBN: 978-1-84362-355-7
- OCLC: 70882258

When a Monster is Born is a 2006 children's book written by Sean Taylor and illustrated by Nick Sharratt. It won the Nestlé Children's Book Prize Gold Award and was nominated for the Kate Greenaway Medal.
