= Jean Jullien (designer) =

French graphic designer and illustrator (born 1983)

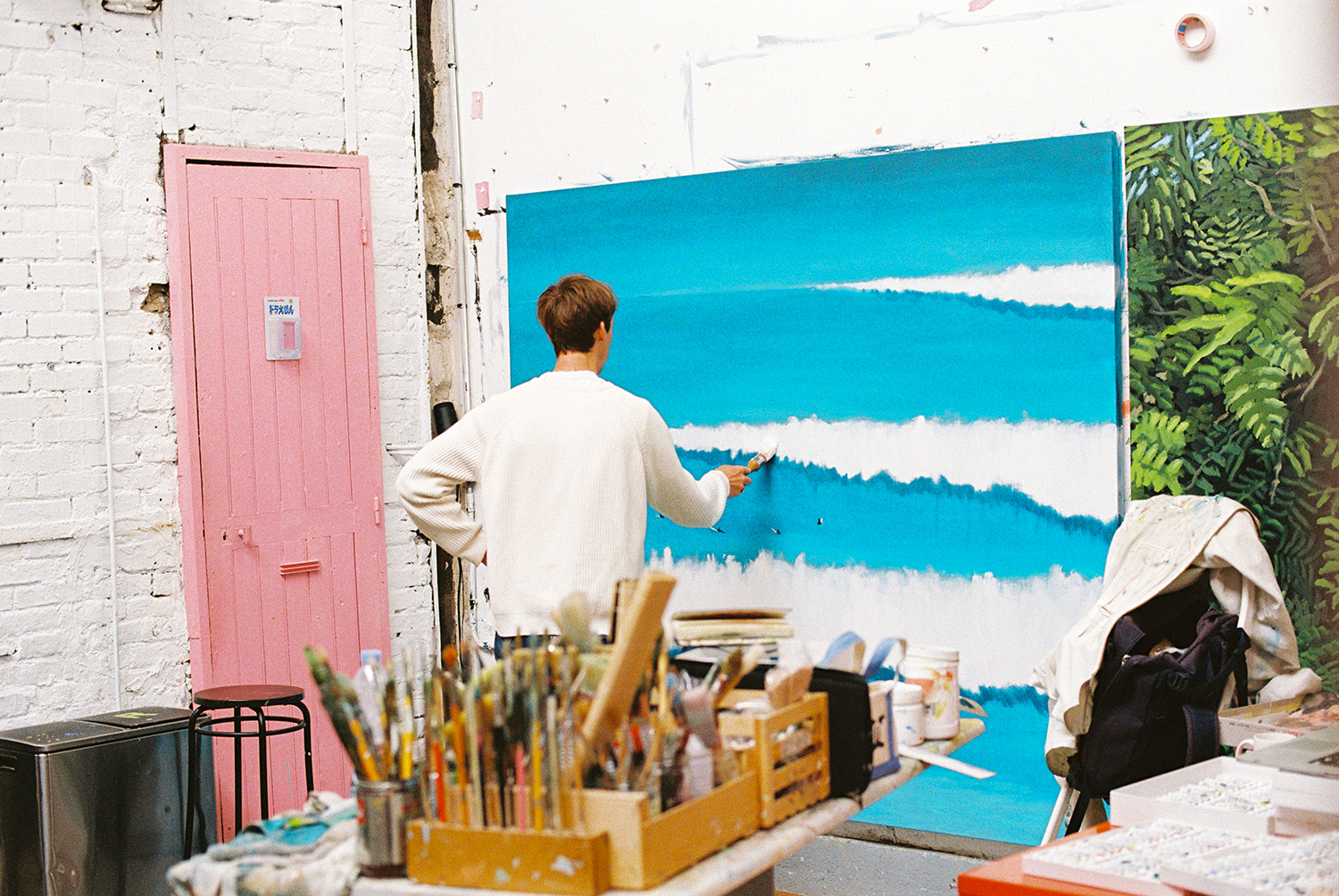
- Born: 14 March 1983 (age 43); Cholet, France
- Education: Central Saint Martins; Royal College of Art
- Website: jeanjullien.com

Jean Jullien (born 14 March 1983) is a French graphic designer and illustrator.

== Biography ==
=== Early life ===
Jullien was born in Cholet. He lived in Nantes and then moved to London in his twenties; he studied at the Central Saint Martins College of Art and Design and the Royal College of Art. His work has appeared in publications including Télérama, Le Nouvel Observateur, The New York Times and The Guardian, showcased in multiple galleries including Meraki Gallery and M.E.M.E. Art Gallery, and his clients have included the Pompidou Centre, Yale University and Nike.

=== Peace for Paris ===
Original artwork "Peace for Paris"

In the wake of the November 2015 terrorist attacks in Paris, Jullien created a variation of a classic peace symbol invoking the Eiffel Tower. The image swiftly went viral through social media and news coverage of worldwide sympathies and affirmations of solidarity against terrorism. He also published a drawing in solidarity after the Charlie Hebdo shootings in January 2015.

The French embassy in Berlin used his symbol in an exterior lighting installation, accompanied by the slogan #NousSommesUnis (we are united).

=== International uses of Peace for Paris ===
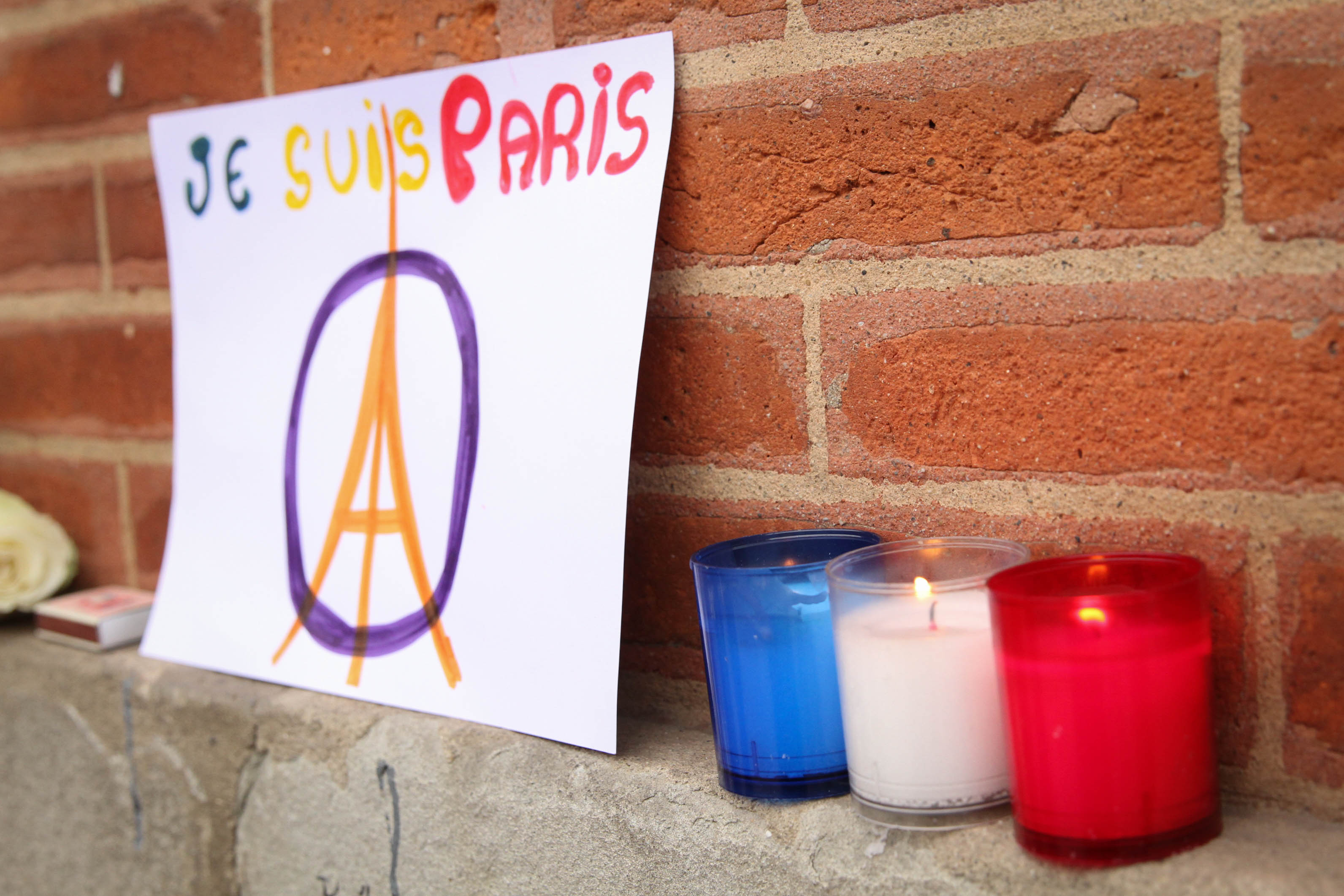
Toulouse

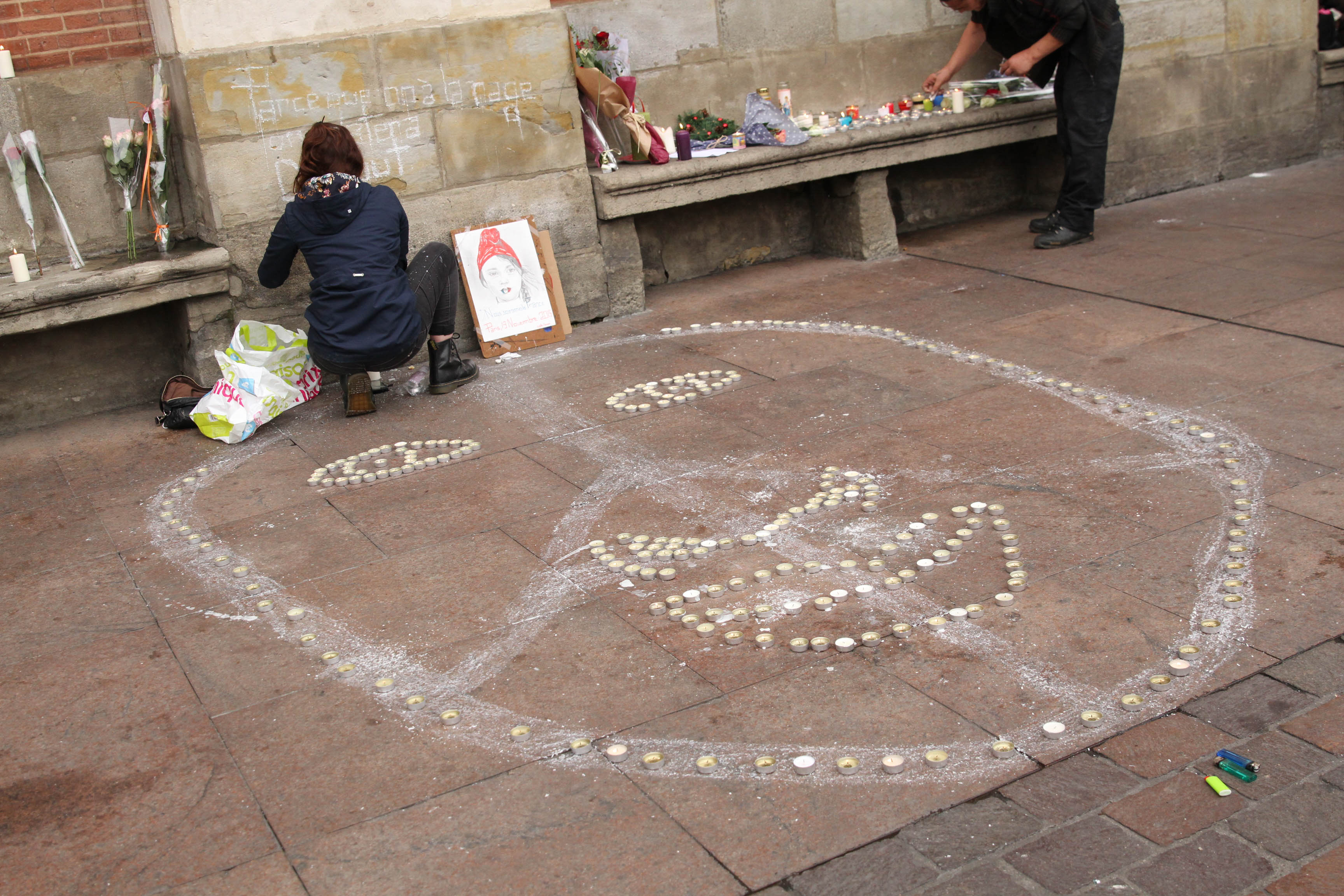
Toulouse

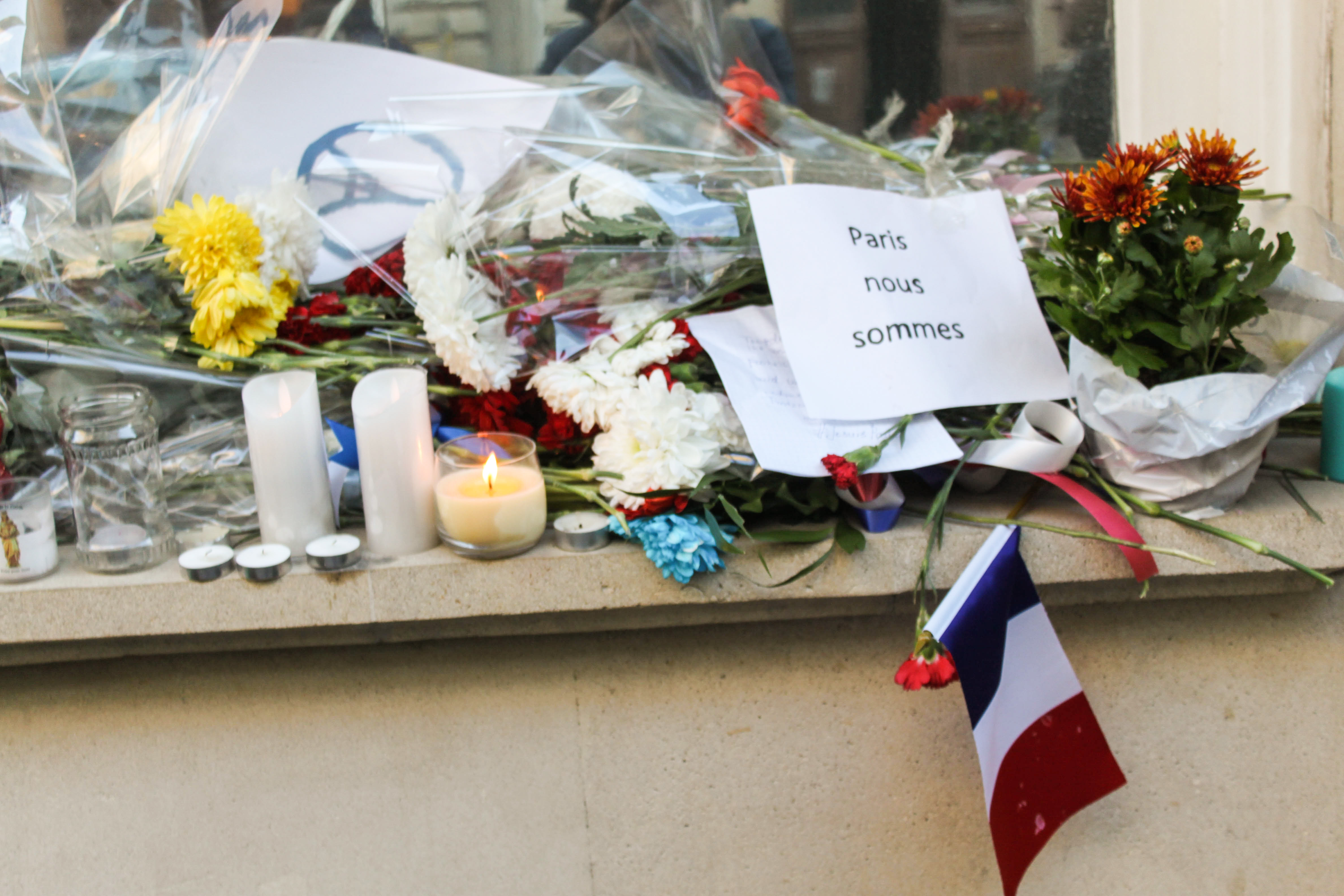
Baku

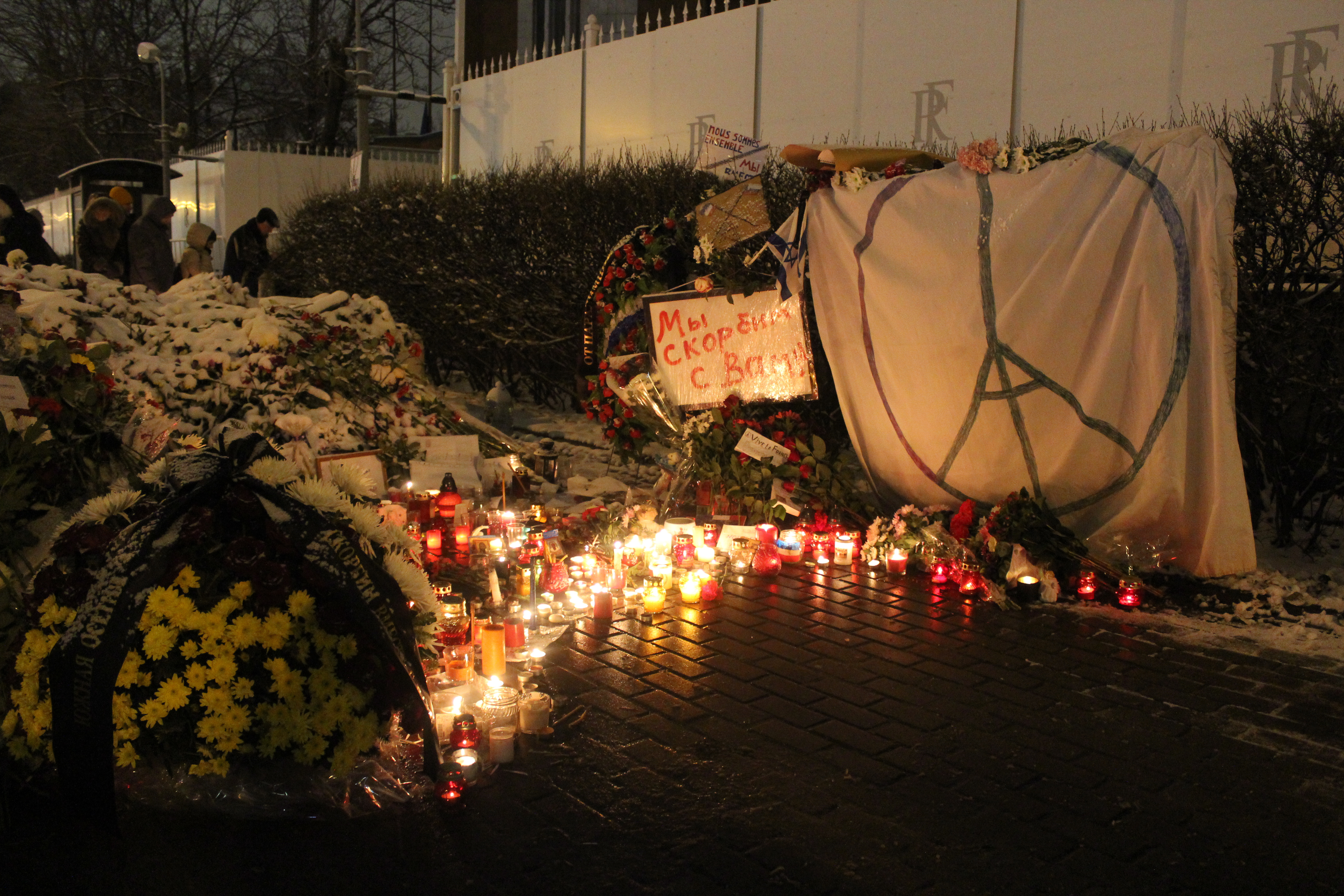
Moscow

== Awards and honors ==
Awards for Jullien's books
Year	Title	Award	Result	Ref.
2015	Hoot Owl, Master of Disguise (as illus.)	Cybils Award for Fiction Picture Books	Finalist	
2016	Hoot Owl, Master of Disguise (as illus.)	Charlotte Zolotow Award	Honor	
2018	Why The Face?	Cybils Award for Board Books	Finalist	
2021	This Is Still Not A Book	Cybils Award for Board Books	Finalist	

== Publications ==
=== As author and illustrator ===
- Des mots globe-trotters (2012, with Sylvain Alzial)
- Ralf (2015, Juventud, ISBN 978-8-4261-4188-0)
- Alceste-la-chouette, roi du camouflage (2015, with Sean Taylor)
- Low Glow (2016, Hato Press, ISBN 978-1-9102-3929-2)
- Modern Life (2016, Te Neues Publishing Company, ISBN 978-3-8327-3375-9)
- Release Your Anger: Swear Word Coloring Book for Adults (2016, Lee Copeland, ISBN 978-0-9960-9300-2)
- This Is Not A Book (2016, Phaidon Press, ISBN 978-0-7148-7112-7)
- Before & After (2017, Phaidon Press, ISBN 978-0-7148-7408-1)
- Under Dogs (2017, Hato Press, ISBN 978-1-9102-3931-5)
- Why The Face (2018, Phaidon Press, ISBN 978-0-7148-7719-8)
- Still Not A Book (2021, Phaidon Press, ISBN 978-1-8386-6274-5)
- Jean Jullien (2022, Phaidon Press, ISBN 978-1-8386-6319-3)

=== As illustrator only ===
- Hoot Owl, Master of Disguise, written by Sean Taylor (2014, Candlewick Press, ISBN 978-0-7636-7578-3)
- Die trinkende Frau, written by Elisabeth Raether (2016)
- I Want to Be in a Scary Story, written by Sean Taylor (2017, Candlewick Press, ISBN 978-0-7636-8953-7)
- Imagine, written by John Lennon (2017, Frances Lincoln Children's Books, ISBN 978-1-8478-0896-7)
- Peter, le chat debout, written by Nadine Robert (2017, Comme des géants, ISBN 978-2-9243-3232-0)
- Mon Petit Papa, written by Davide Calì (2022, Sarbacane, ISBN 978-2-3773-1827-8)
