= Thackara =

Thackara is a surname. Notable people with the surname include:

- Alexander Montgomery Thackara (1848–1937), American diplomat
- Anthony Thackara (1917–2007), British cricketer
- Eleanor Sherman Thackara (1859-1915), American philanthropist
- James Thackara (born 1944), American-British writer
- John Thackara (born 1951), British writer, advisor and public speaker
