= John Thackara =

British writer (born 1951)

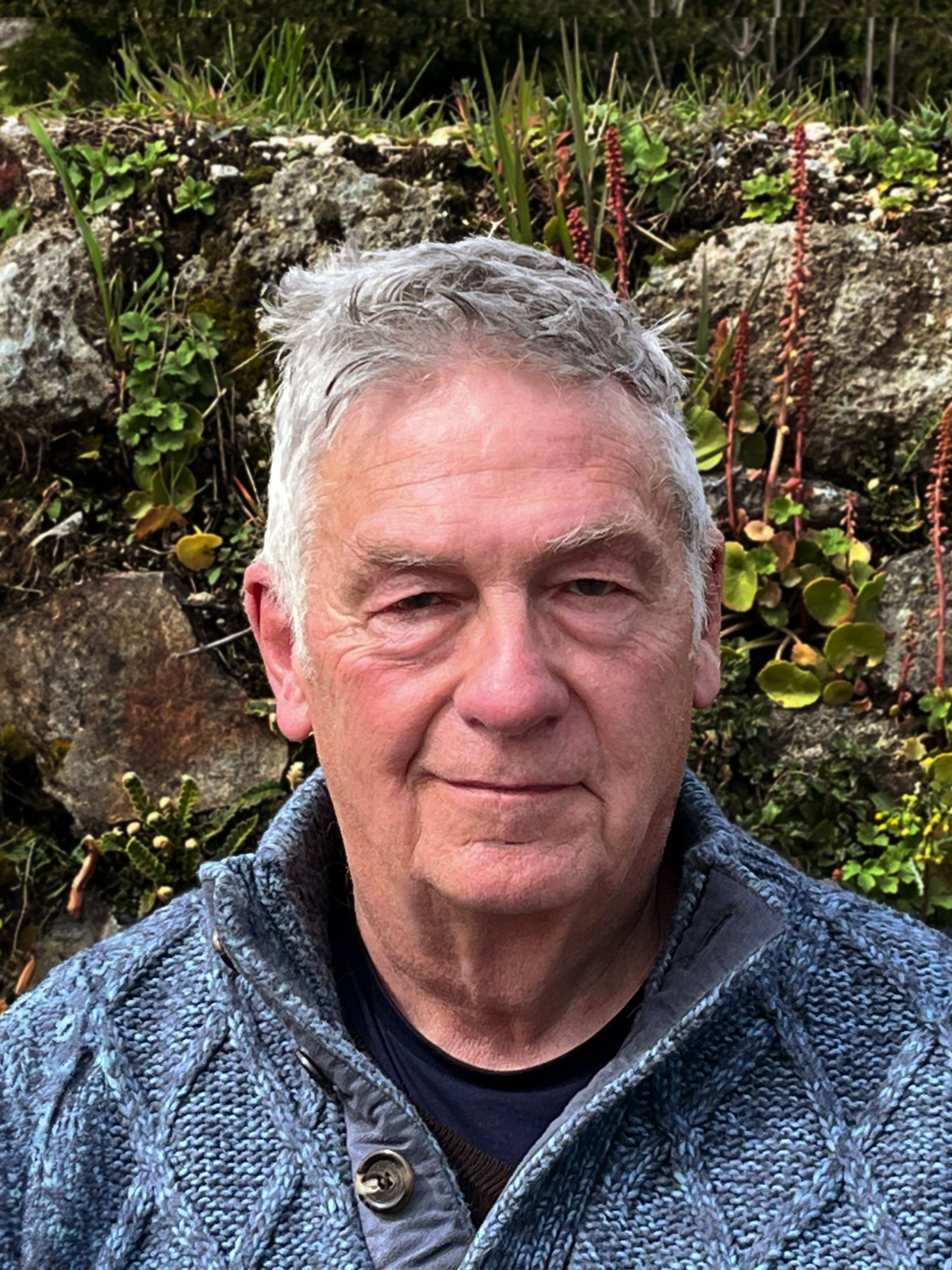
- John Thackara, March 2024, South of France
- Born: 6 August 1951 (age 74); Newcastle upon Tyne
- Occupations: Author, curator, educator
- Known for: Director Dutch Design Institute; Curator Doors of Perception
- Website: https://thackara.com/

John Thackara (born 6 August 1951, Newcastle upon Tyne) is a British-born author, curator and educator. He is known as curator of the celebrated Doors of Perception conference for 20 years, which started in Amsterdam. He is a Senior Fellow at the Royal College of Art in London; a visiting professor at Tongji University in Shanghai, and Glasgow School of Art in Scotland; and is a member of the Advisory Board of BITS Design in Mumbai and the Bioregional Learning Centre in England.

== Biography ==
=== Early life and education ===
Thackara was born in Newcastle upon Tyne, England as son of Alexander Daniel Thackara, and Eleanor Hazel, née Miller. He attended Marlborough College from 1964 to 1969, and the University of Kent from 1970 to 1974, where he obtained his BA in philosophy. He continued his studies at the University of Wales Centre for Journalism Studies in the year 1974–75 obtaining his master's degree, journalism.

After his philosophy education and journalist training he worked for ten years as a book publisher and magazine editor. In 1993 he was appointed the first director of the Netherlands Design Institute, in Amsterdam. He was assisted here by deputy director Gert Staal. Thackara himself served until 1999.

=== Further career ===
In Amsterdam Thackara had initiated the Doors of Perception conference, which he kept curating from 2000 to 2016. He has been program director of Designs of the Time (Dott), the social innovation biennial in England. He also curated City Eco Lab – the French design biennial. He cofounded (with Andrea Paoletti) the Village Hosts movement in Europe. Thackara has curated place-based professional workshops – called xskools – in 11 countries. Further more Thackara has given keynote talks, and chaired international conferences, in 41 countries; he has chaired or served on professional awards juries in the US, India, and Europe.

Appointed a senior fellow at the RCA in 2011, Thackara is currently visiting professor at Tongji University in Shanghai, and Glasgow School of Art; and is a member of the Advisory Board of BITS Design in Mumbai and the Bioregional Learning Centre in England.

Thackara once drove a London bus (routes 73 and 134). He lives in South West France.

=== Honors, awards and positions ===
- UK Design Of The Year, Design Week, November 1995, for "T-Zone" exhibition
- Webby Award (USA) 1999 Webby Awards, Peoples Voice Award, Art, for Doors of Perception website
- Recognition of Service Award, ACM Association for Computing Machinery August 2000, Co-Chair DIS'00 – Designing Interactive Systems 2000
- Fellow, The Young Foundation, January 2004
- Fellow, Musashino Art University, Japan: August 2008
- Best Architecture Book of the Year, The Netherlands: deArchitect, December 2010 Top 10 architectuurboeken 2010 #01: John Thackara, Plan B
- ADI Design Index, Italy, Best Product of Italian design, 2010 ("I migliori prodotti del design italiano del 2009") "In the Bubble. Design per un futuro sostenibile" Umberto Allemandi & C., John Thackara, Pier Paolo Peruccio (curatore). ADI Design Index.Category "Ricerca storica, teorica, critica e editoria"
- Senior Fellow, Royal College of Art June 2011
- Honorary Doctorate, Plymouth University, United Kingdom August 2015 "being a person distinguished in eminence and by attainments"

=== Personal ===
Thackara lives in south-west France with his wife, Kristi van Riet. His daughter, Kate Thackara, lives in London and Florence, where she is an art teacher.

Thackara's great great great grandfather was William Tecumseh Sherman (1820–1891) Commanding General of the United States Army from 1869 to 1883. His great great grandfather, Alexander Montgomery Thackara (1848–1937), addressed as "Mont" in family correspondence, married Sherman's daughter Eleanor Sherman (1859–1915) in 1880

== Work ==
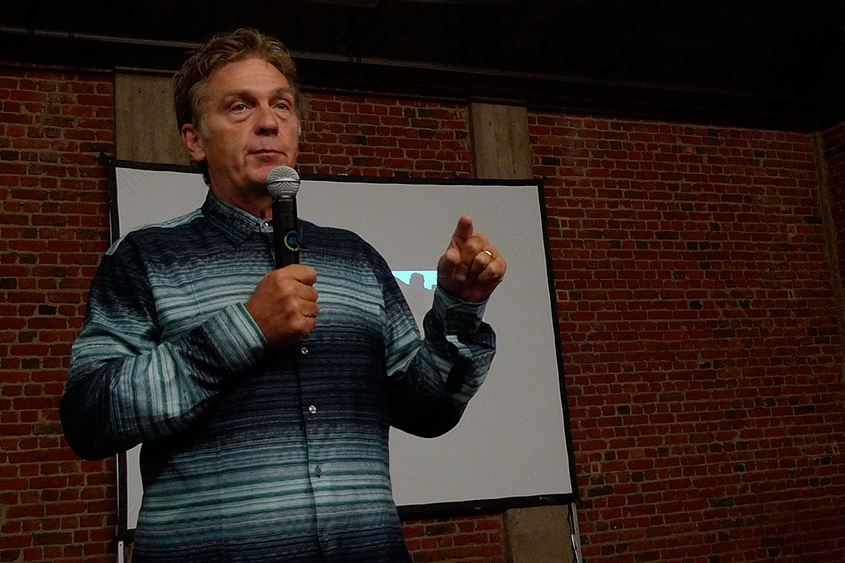
John Thackara on stage in Gent Belgium October 2010

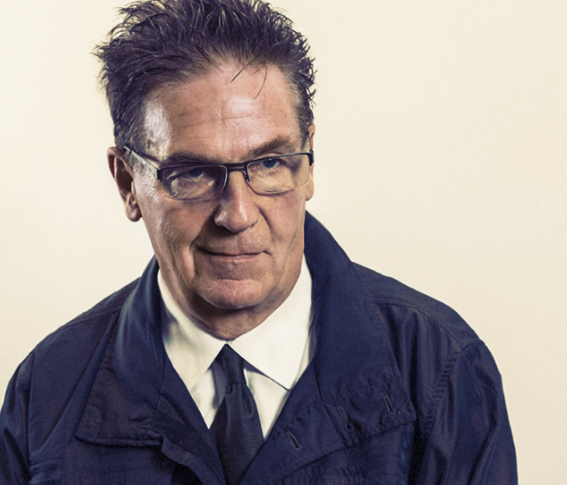
John Thackara at Barcelona Elisava, 2016

Thackara writes about live examples of what a sustainable future can be like with a special focus on social and ecological design. He has published online since 1993 at thackara.com and in books; his most recent title is How To Thrive In the Next Economy (Thames & Hudson 2015).

=== Early work experiences ===
From 1974 to 1980 Thackara worked as a commissioning editor in book publishing, first for Granada Publishing in the UK, and latterly for New South Wales University Press in Sydney Australia. During this time he was also the founder and editor (with Hilary Arnold) of Cheap Eats in Sydney.

From 1980 to 1985, on returning from Australia, he was editor of the UK Design Council's monthly publication, Design.

During 1985–1990, Thackara worked as a freelance journalist. He was, inter alia, Modern Culture Editor, Harpers & Queen; Design Correspondent for The Guardian; Design Correspondent for The Spectator; and a contributor to the Late Show (BBC).

Prior to the Netherlands Design Institute, Thackara was founder and managing director of Design Analysis International Limited. The activities of this small London-based company included an International symposium on science, innovation and design for the Asahi Shimbun (Tokyo, 1987); exhibitions for Axis Gallery (Tokyo); a conference on Interactivity and Environments for the European Commission (Paris, 1989); An exhibition called Image and Object at the Centre Pompidou (Paris 1989); Mirror of Medicine, an exhibition for the 150th anniversary the British Medical Journal, curator Peter Dormer; research and commentary on the BBC Design Awards programmes in 1990 and 1992; T-Zone, an exhibition of Japanese architecture and video, with Riiche Miyake, for the Architectural Association (Brussels and London 1992); The Inventive Spirit, a touring art, technology and design exhibition for the UK Foreign and Commonwealth Office (Vienna, Leipzig, Turin, Brussels, 1992); and Sovereign, research and procurement (in ten months, from start to opening) of a national exhibition at the Victoria and Albert Museum to commemorate The Queen's 40th anniversary as sovereign. Designed by Pentagram. (London 1992).

Thackara was the first director (1993–1999) of the Netherlands Design Institute. The institute, which was founded by the Dutch government and the city of Amsterdam in 1993, was a think-and-do tank whose mission was to increase the economic and social contribution of design. The institute's projects brought together a variety of design specialists, users, and experts in many other disciplines. Doors of Perception was the institute's flagship conference. Thackara left the institute in 1999 and set up Doors of Perception as an independent company in 2000.

From 1998 to 2002 Thackara was also director of research at the Royal College of Art (RCA) in London. He was appointed to this newly created position by the RCA's then rector, Jocelyn Stevens, to develop a research strategy, and a programme of live, real-world projects, that would help the college take a leadership role as an outward-facing centre of innovation. During his time at the RCA, Thackara helped establish the Helen Hamlyn Centre for Design.

=== Doors of Perception, Amsterdam, 2000–16, Founder and Director ===
Thackara was the founder and director of Doors of Perception. This event production company organised festivals in Europe and India which brought together grassroots innovators to work with designers to imagine sustainable futures – and take practical steps to meet basic needs in new and sustainable ways. This hybrid community of practice was inspired by two related questions: "we know what new technology can do, but what is it for?" and, "how do we want to live?". The results are published on the Doors of Perception website, and discussed at the Doors of Perception conference.

== Publications ==
=== Books ===
- New British Design. Co-edited with Stuart Jane. London: Thames & Hudson, 1987.
- Design After Modernism. (Japanese edition, revised). Tokyo: Kajima, 1992.
- Design After Modernism: Beyond the Object (ed). London: Thames & Hudson, 1988.
- Image and Object: Nouveau Design de Londres (ed). Paris: Centre Pompidou, 1990.
- Leading Edge. (ed) Tokyo: Axis 1990.
- T-Zone. (co-edited with Riiche Miyake) Brussels: Europalia (in association with Architectural Association) 1991.
- Architects' Data: Handbook of Building Types. Ernst Neufert, (ed John Thackara, Vincent Jones) London Wiley, 1992.
- DoPRom (Doors of Perception). CDRom; co-editor. Amsterdam: Mediamatic, 1994.
- Lost In Space: A Traveler's Tale. Haarlem: De Grafische Haarlem, 1994.
- European Design Prize Winners! How Today's Successful Companies Innovate by Design. London: Gower, 1997.
- The New Geographies of Learning. Amsterdam: University of Professional Education (HvA), 2003.
- In the Bubble: Designing in a Complex World. Cambridge, Mass: MIT Press, 2005.
  - In the Bubble, de la complexité au design durable (French edition). Publication de l'université de St Etienne, Cité du Design éditions.
  - Plano B – Plan B – In the bubble (Brazil edition).
  - In the Bubble – Design Per un Futuro Sostenibile. (Italian edition), Editore Allemandi, 2008.
- Wouldn't It be Great If.... Designs of The Time Manual. London, Design Council, 2007..
- Clean Growth: From Mindless Development to Design Mindfulness, Innovation. (White paper 1/6), Series Editor Stuart Madonald, The Robert Gordon University, Aberdeen, 2009.
- How to Thrive in the Next Economy: Designing Tomorrow's World Today, London Thames & Hudson 2015

=== Selection of 20 chapters (from 90+ published) in multiple-author books ===
- Stories of reconnection: Water design in bioregions in Water Works: Eco-social Design, Eds de Henriette Waal and Clemens Driessen, Vaiiz, 2025
- Bioregioning: Pathways to Urban-Rural Reconnection, She Ji, 2019
- Making As Connecting in Design as a Tool for Transition, Luma Arles, 2019
- New Bauhaus Vorkurs (Preliminary Course) in Bauhaus Lessons, Bauhaus Foundation, Spector Books Leipzig, 2019
- Design for a Restorative Economy in Design Harvests: An Acupunctural Design Approach Towards Sustainability, Lou Yonqi, Francesca Valsecchi, Clarissa Diaz (eds.) Mistra Urban Futures, 2019
- From Neighbourhood To Bioregion: The City as a Living System in Human Cities: Challenging The City Scale, Cité du Design St. Etienne 2018
- From Oil Age to Soil Age in Fear and Love: Reactions To A Complex World, London, Phaidon, 2016
- Chapter in Design and Violence Paola Antonelli( ed.) New York: Museum of Modern Art, 2015
- A Whole New Cloth: Politics And The Fashion System in Handbook of Sustainable Fashion, Kate Fletcher & Linds Grose (eds.) Routledge, London, 2014
- Design In The Light Of Dark Energy in Architecture and Energy William Braham (eds.) Taylor & Francis, New York) 2013
- Architecture Without Buildings in Archiphoenix: Faculties for Architecture, Ana Dzokic Neelen, Saskia van Stein (eds.) Netherlands Architecture Institute, Rotterdam, 2010
- Climate Change: Metrics, or Aesthetics? in Cultural strategies for a new world: Proceedings of
- Forum d’Avignon 2009. Editions Gallimard, Paris, 2010
- The Innovator Next Door in What Matters, McKinsey Quarterly, 2009
- City Eco Lab, Biennale Internationale Design Saint-Etienne ed Constance Rubini Cité du Design, 2008
- Designers and the Age of Fear in Interactions, Volume 12, Association for Computing Machinery, 2005
- Next, in Venice Architecture Biennale, D Sudjic (ed.) Venice, 2003
- The Killer App Is Green in Proceedings of NIC 2001, New York: ACM, 2001
- The Design Challenge Of Pervasive Computing, in Proceedings of CHI2000. New York, ACM, 2000
- Chapter in Workspheres. Paola Antonelli (ed.) New York: Museum of Modern Art, 1998
- Chapter in Formes des Metropoles, ed. F. Burkhardt. Paris, Centre Pompidou, 1992
- Chapter in Tokyo Design Visions, Toyo Ito (ed.) London: Victoria & Albert Museum, 1992

=== Website, newsletter, blog ===
- Thackara.com and Doors of Perception (blog) since 2004.
- Doors of Perception Report (email newsletter), monthly since March 2002.

=== Design Observer (essays 2002-2014) ===
- https://designobserver.com/authors/john-thackara/

== Biennials, conference chair, professional juries ==
- Biennale Interieur (Kortrijk, Belgium, 1994) international jury
- European Design Prize (Brussels, 1994) jury and conference chair
- DNP Network Art Award (Tokyo, 1996) international jury
- Intelligent Information Interfaces (i3) (Europe, 2000) project chair, presence
- International Browser Day (The Netherlands, 2002) conference and jury chair
- Spark! Design For Local Knowledge (Oslo, 2003) conference chair
- Fused Space (Rotterdam, 2004) INTERNATIONAL JUry
- Aspen Design Summit (Aspen, 2006) conference chair
- Picnic Green Challenge (Amsterdam, 2007) international jury
- Dott 07 (Newcastle, 2007) Social Innovation Biennial, programme director
- City Eco Lab (St Etienne, 2008) French Design Biennial, curator
- Forum d’Avignon (Avignon, 2009) Beyond GDP: panel chair
- EDF Sustainable Design Challenge (Paris, 2010) international jury
- Royal Society of Arts (London, 2009) Design Futures Awards, jury chair
- Victor Papanek Award (Vienna, 2011) international jury
- India Future of Change (India, 2011) Designing Innovation, international jury
- Rotterdam Design Prize (Rotterdam, 2011) jury chair
- Conde Nast Traveller Design Awards (London, 2011) international jury
- Buckminster Fuller Award (New York, 2011) international jury
- World Design Forum (Eindhoven, 2011, 2012) WDF12 Design & Health, conference chair
- Audi Urban Future Initiative (Istanbul, 2012), international jury, chair
- Unbox Festival (Delhi 2013) AHRC Social Innovation Challenge, jury president
- Curry Stone Design Prize (USA, 2014) international jury
- Chora Connection (Copenhagen, 2015) Back To The Land Symposium, chair
- Sustrans (London, 2015) Sustainable Mobility, chair
- Lab For Change Makers (Amsterdam, 2015) symposium chair
- Fluid Time Symposium (Vienna, 2015) symposium chair
- Core77 Design Awards (USA, 2015) Design for Social Impact, jury chair
