= Doors of Perception =

Conference

Doors of Perception is a design conference in Europe and India which brought together grassroots innovators to work with designers to imagine sustainable futures – and take practical steps to meet basic needs in new and sustainable ways. Its founder and first director is John Thackara.

This hybrid community of practice was inspired by two related questions: "we know what new technology can do, but what is it for?" and, "how do we want to live?". The results are published on the Doors of Perception website, and discussed at the Doors of Perception conference.

Numerous people and organizations contributed over the years to the conferences and its organisation. The first editions were supported by the Netherlands Design Institute and Mediamatic and people such as Jules Marshall and Gert Staal. In the new millennium the Center for Knowledge Societies organized three of the later conferences in India.

== History ==
=== Key Doors of Perception events ===
The first Doors of Perception from 1993 to 2000 took place in Amsterdam. After the first edition they all had a theme of their own. The first conference and theme were:

- Doors 1 (Amsterdam, 1993)
- Doors 2 "Home" (Amsterdam, 1994)
- Doors 3 "Info-Eco" (Amsterdam, 1994)
- Doors 4 "Speed" (Amsterdam, 1996)
- Doors 5 "Play" (Amsterdam, 1998)
- Doors 6 "Lightness" (Amsterdam, 2000)

In the year 2000 a dual conference was held in India, called 'Doors East,' and in the year 2002 there were two conferences as well. The tradition to focus on one central theme continued.

- Doors East (Ahmedabad, India, 2000)
- Doors 7 "Flow" (Amsterdam, 2002)
- Doors East 2 "Tomorrow's Services" (Bangalore, 2002)
- Doors 8 "Infra" (Bangalore, 2005)
- Doors 9 "Food" (Delhi 2007)

=== The separate editions ===
In every edition multiple subjects were under debate, such as:

1993

- Tomorrow's Literacies - lectures and exhibition at Frankfurt Book Fair
- Eternally Yours - conference and book on product endurance
- The New Old report and conference (with UK DesignAge Network)
- Materials of Invention: seminar series and book
- The Cultural Economy Of The Applied Arts - report
- Design And The Culture Industries - international professional meeting
- Doors of Perception 1: plus DoP CDRom

1994

- European Community Design Prize (with EU)
- European Design Industry Summit (with EU)
- Design Across Europe - report on the European design industry
- Toshio Iwai: Media Artist - exhibition for opening of Institute's building
- Action-Reaction - exhibition in Japan
- Doors of Perception 2 "Home"
- Smart Matter - smart materials seminar, with Stedelijk Museum

1995

- Doors of Perception 3- "Info-Eco"
- The Flat Space - exhibition and CDRom of design for electronic screens
- The Prototype- workshop series
- From Dada To Data, conference, with Virtual Platform & Council of Europe

1996

- World Internet Expo: Dutch Pavilion
- Doors of Perception 4 - "Speed"
- Legible City - conference on cities and information
- Things That Think : design/business workshops on smart materials
- Doors of Perception 4 - 'Speed'

1997

- Design In The Knowledge Economy - seminar series
- The Flat Space 2 - screen design futures
- European Design Industry Summit
- European Design Prize
- Winners! - book published
- Wisseltroom - design scenarios for the future of mobility
- Eternally Yours – conference and book on long-life products

1998

- Doors of Perception 5 - "play"
- O2 Website - for eco-designers worldwide
- Lightness – book + lectures
- Young Designers and Industry 18 European companies + scenarios
- From Practice To Policy - new media conference with Virtual Platform

1999

- Presence – European project on elderly and internet
- Maypole - European project on social computing
- Trespassers - publication on design scenarios for sustainability
- Wisselstroom - design scenarios for transport intersections
- Kust op de Kaart - website and knowledge map of coastal projects
- If/Then - Europe/USA publication of "yearbook of the near future"

=== Hong Kong Design Task Force. 2000 ===
Thackara was the expert advisor to the Hong Kong Design Task Force (chair: Victor Lo) which developed a new innovation and research policy for the Hong Kong Polytechnic University. The task force plotted the best way for Hong Kong and China to move up the value chain from a product-based to a service-and-flow based economy. Following the report, Hong Kong launched a "DesignSmart" initiative with the creation of a HK$250million (25 million euros) fund.

=== Interaction Design Institute Ivrea, Italy, 2001–04 ===
Thackara was an advisor and then served on the start-up Steering Committee (chaired by Franco Debenedetti) of this start-up postgraduate institute founded by Telecom Italia. Its founding director was Gillian Crampton Smith. Thackara's specific tasks were to help develop and articulate the institute's basic concept and organisational form; define and articulate the roles of, and benefits to, industry sponsors; organize an international workshop of experts to refine the research programme; and produce an inaugural event

=== Designs of The Time (Dott 07) North East England 2005–08 ===
During 2005–2007 Thackara was programme director of Designs of the Time (Dott 2007) in North East England. Dott 07 was a two-year programme of sustainability projects commissioned by the Design Council and the region's economic Regional development agency, One NorthEast. Dott 07 culminated in a two-week festival on the banks of the River Tyne in North East England and was visited by 30,000 people. Dott was inspired by two questions: "what might life in a sustainable region be like? (and) what design steps might get us there?".

=== City Eco Lab (St Etienne, France) 2007–08 ===
As Commissioner of France's main design biennial, Thackara curated an event called City Eco Lab. Conceived as a 'nomadic market of projects’, City Eco Lab made projects visible to the wider populace and started people talking about ways they might be improved or about doing similar projects themselves. 46 live projects from the St Etienne region were shown side-by-side with best practice projects from other parts of the world. The event was hosted by the Cite du Design; its designers were Exyzt and Gaelle Gabillet.
