= Andrea Siodmok =

British industrial designer and social innovator

Andrea Siodmok OBE FRSA (née Cooper) (born 1972) is a British industrial designer and social innovator. She is a Professor and Dean of the School of Design at the Royal Melbourne Institute of Technology (RMIT University). She is currently also visiting Professor for impact at Northumbria University and a Governor of the Glasgow School of Art. Andrea received an OBE for public service in the 2021 Queen's Birthday Honours.

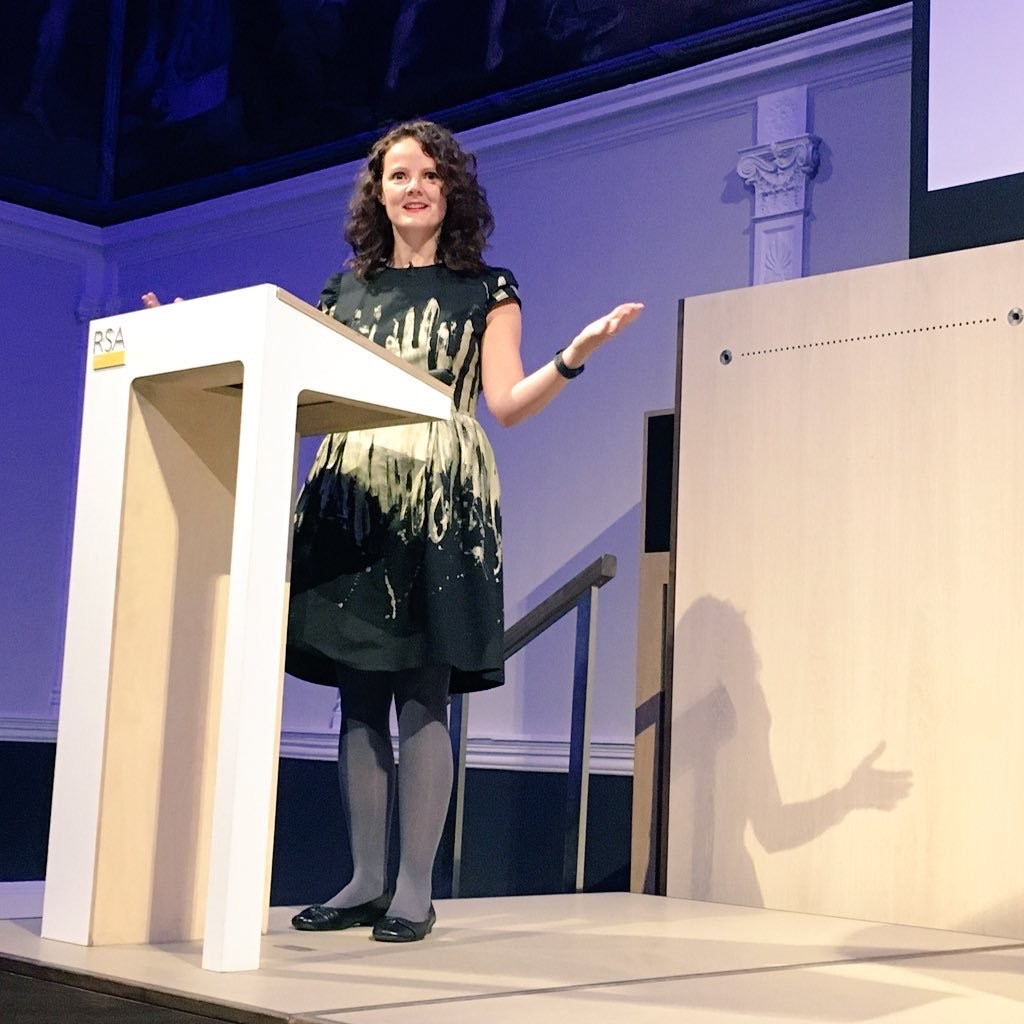

== Early life and education ==
Siodmok was born in the West Midlands, the daughter of a Military Officer in the Royal Air Force. She attended Garendon High School and Burleigh Community College in Loughborough, boarding at Field House. After this she studied art and design at the University of Wolverhampton, industrial design at Newcastle Polytechnic and public policy at The London School of Economics. Siodmok also has a PhD in Virtual Reality sponsored by BT from Northumbria University. In 2016, she received an honorary doctorate in Civil Law from Northumbria University, in 'Recognition of her status as one of the UK's foremost design thinkers'. Her grandfather, the research chemist Raymond Cooper, was part of the 1960s team from Boots who developed the painkiller ibuprofen working with Stewart Adams.

== Career ==
On graduating, Siodmok was invited to join the faculty teaching industrial design and transportation design. As an academic, she taught design practice and theory while also undertaking a PhD in Virtual Reality at the Human Factors department of BT's Adastral Park. Siodmok's PhD research documented in detail a design approach to the development of virtual reality projects undertaken at the futures lab of BT and in design consultancy. Here she ran industry projects, including a 'special project' with Jony Ive whilst he was at Apple Computers.

From 1994 onwards, Siodmok worked as an industrial designer at Octo Design in Newcastle, with some of her earliest consultancy work being designing the then world's smallest x-ray machine (by Bede Scientific for NASA) as well as medical instruments and a range of consumer products. However, after designing hundreds of shapes for air fresheners, she became increasingly disillusioned with the superficiality of product design and wanted to apply design to more socially deserving causes. Inspired by E. F. Schumacher's 'Small is Beautiful', Papanek's 'Design for the Real World' and Nigel Whiteley's 'Design for Society', over the next decade Siodmok set out to explore the boundaries of design practice applying design for social good, service design, sustainability and establishing the nascent field of policy design.

In 2002 Siodmok joined the UK Design Council, becoming their first Chief Design Officer. Here she was an early proponent of service design, championing greater public involvement in designing public services. At the Design Council she was part of the small design strategy team behind the 'Double Diamond' process and design "methodbank".

In 2009 Siodmok left the Design Council and became the Programme Director of 'Designs of the Time' social innovation biennale after Dott07 by John Thackara. The design programme concluded with a nine-week-long celebration of design across the region, which was Cornwall's first Cornwall Design Festival. Following this, Siodmok became Chief Designer for service design and innovation for Cornwall Council.

In 2014 Siodmok founded the UK Government's first Policy Lab to open up policy-making and bring new digital, data science and design methods to 20,000 policy-makers across the UK Government, with a report from government noting at the time: "if there's one set of skills departments lack it's not policymaking, it's designing". In 2015 she was a recipient of the Royal Society of Arts Bicentenary Medal awarded to individuals for their outstanding contributions to the advancement of design in industry and society.

Siodmok has authored various chapters about policy design and been published in the Royal Society of Arts Journal.

From 2020 to 2023 she was a trustee at CIPD. In 2022 she became Chief Impact Officer at the Royal Society of Arts, Manufactures and Commerce (RSA). She is a member of the 1851 Royal Commission Committee, and is visiting professor at Northumbria University. She was previously an external examiner for service design at the Royal College of Art.

== Honours ==
- Siodmok was awarded an OBE in the Queen's birthday honours 2021.
- In 2016, she received an honorary doctorate in Civil Law, from Northumbria University, in 'recognition of her status as one of the UK's foremost design thinkers'.
- In 2015 Siodmok became the 10th female in its history to receive the Bicentenary Medal of the Royal Society of Arts.
- Winner, Cabinet Office Awards (2015, 2017 and 2019).
