= Deborah Szebeko =

Deborah Szebeko (born 1980,) is the founding director of the social design agency Thinkpublic.

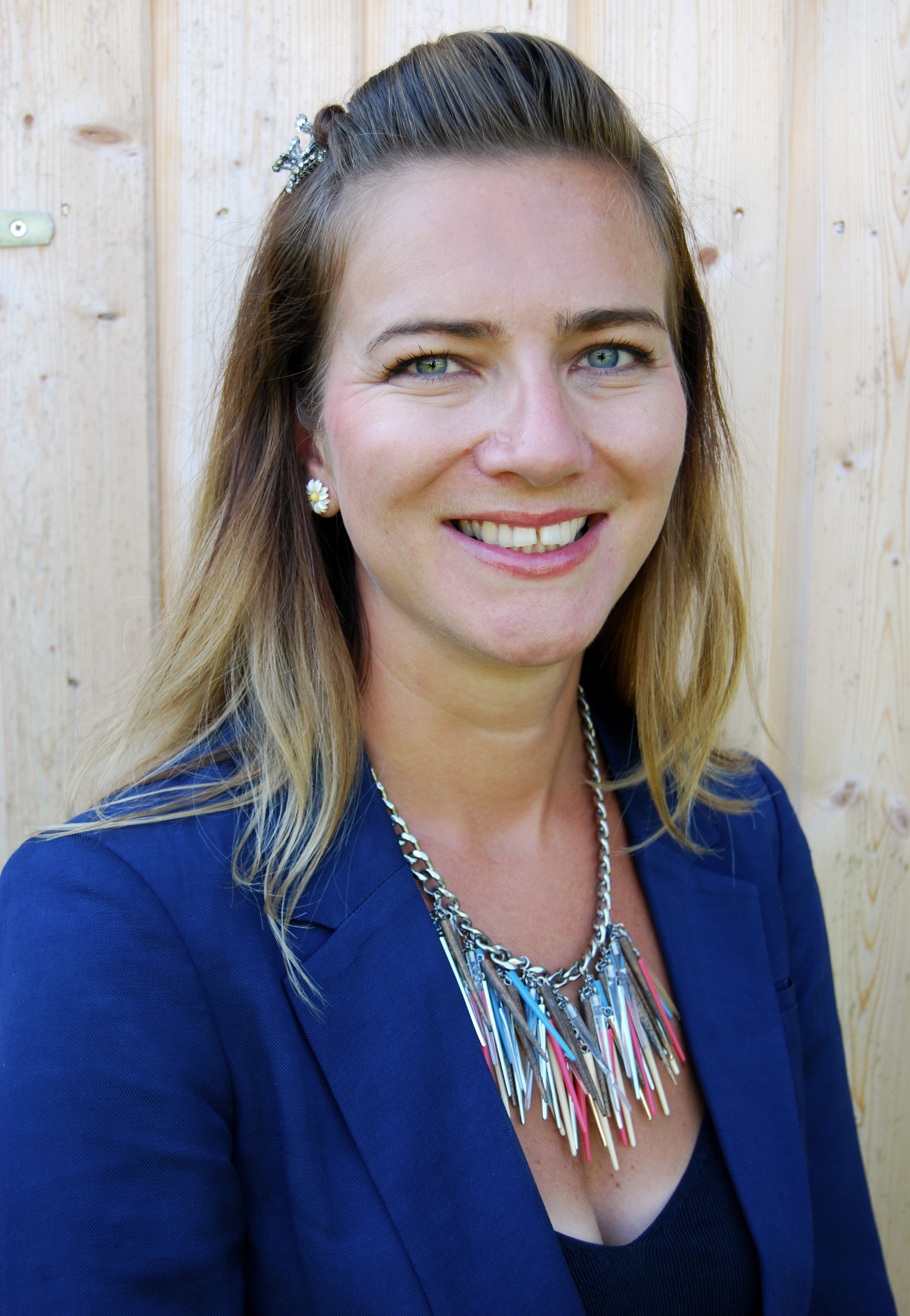
Deborah Szebeko (2016)

== History ==
After volunteering for nine months at Great Ormond Street Children's Hospital NHS Trust in 2003, Szebeko recognized the potential for design to enhance communication and patient experiences in healthcare settings. Szebeko established Thinkpublic in 2004, following participation in the NESTA Creative Pioneer Programme.

Using design to improve health and public services, Szebeko and Thinkpublic have worked with organizations across the world in the health and social sectors, with experience in designing services, products, and social enterprise.

== Co-Design and Service Design ==
The work of Thinkpublic and Szebeko focuses on co-design, a participatory design methodology that engages people in identifying opportunities and needs, and employs creative tools to develop solutions.

Working across the public, third and private sectors, Szebeko has used design and research methodologies to encourage service innovation and enterprise. Over the past 13 years, she has successfully used her service design approach to inform and develop products, enterprises and service innovations that have been rolled out internationally by the NHS Institute for Innovation and Improvement, the Department of Health (UK), NESTA, Alzheimer's Society, Cabinet Office, AstraZeneca, DigitasLBi and Design Council.

== Awards ==
In 2012, thinkpublic won Design Week Service Design Award, followed by being ranked in the top 50 Agencies of the year.

In 2008, for her dedication to social innovation, Szebeko won the British Council's UK Young Design Entrepreneur Award and was listed in the Top 10 for ‘The Future 500’ in The Observer and New Statesman.

In 2003, Szebeko won the HEFSC Young Volunteer of the Year Award for her design work at Great Ormond St Children's Hospital NHS Trust.

== Public speaking ==
Since setting up thinkpublic, Szebeko has presented her work at international design and health conferences including: Leading Age Services Congress (Australia 2015), Design Indaba (Cape Town 2011), The European Business Analysts Conference (London 2010), Women in Design (Poland 2011), Designs of the Time (Cornwall 2011), Reinventing Design (Hong Kong Design Centre, 2008), Designs of the Time (Newcastle, 2007), NESTA Young Innovators (London, 2007), The European Forum on Quality Improvement in Healthcare (Prague, 2006), Doors of Perception (New Delhi, 2005) and DOORS Leaders Round Table (Amsterdam, 2004).

== Publications ==
- Szebeko's work has featured in the following publications:
- Jefferies, E. Tan, L. Yee, J. 2013. Design Transitions – "Inspiring Stores. Global Viewpoints. How Design is Changing." BIS Publisher
- Meroni, A. Sangiorgi, D. 2011. Design For Services - What Design is doing and can do for services, and how this connects to existing fields of knowledge and practice. Gower Publishing
- Bates, P. Robert, G. 2007. Bringing User Experience To Health Care – "Experience Based Design" (EBD) is a new way of bringing about improvements in healthcare services by being user-focused.Radcliffe Publishing

== Academic papers ==
Papers written by Szebeko on Co-design:

- Co-designing for Society - Australasian Medical Journal 2010
- Co-designing for dementia: The Alzheimer 100 project - Australasian Medical Journal 2009
- Szebeko holds a BA (Hons) in Graphic Design & Advertising from Buckinghamshire University, MA in communications from University Of The Arts London and Diploma in Organisations, Relationship and Co-active Coaching.
