= Netherlands Design Institute =

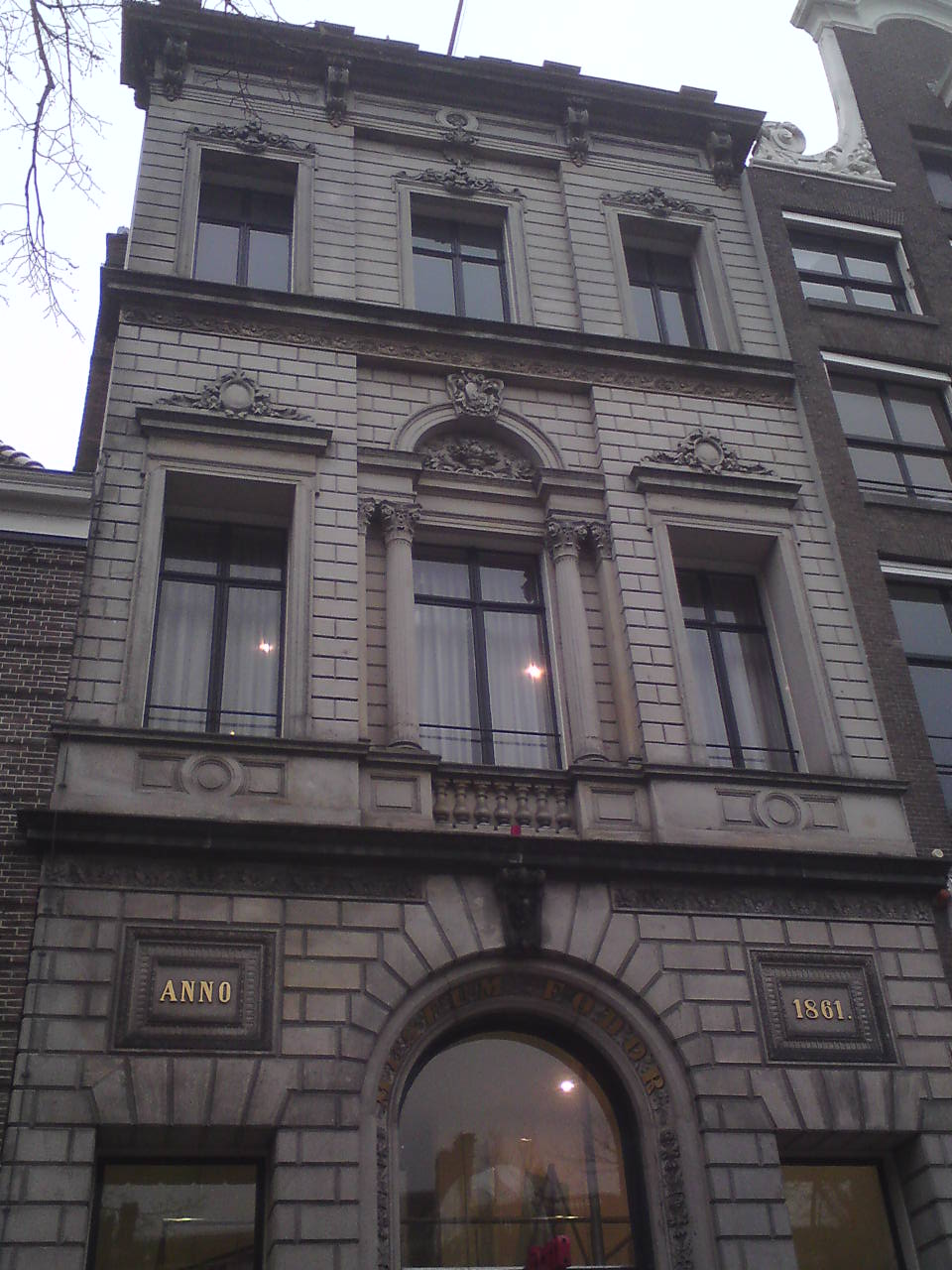
- Location at Keizersgracht, Amsterdam
- Successor: Premsela, Instituut voor Design en Mode
- Location: Keizersgracht, Amsterdam
- Origins: From 1993 to 2003
- Key people: John Thackara (first director)
- Website: rkd.nl

The Netherlands Design Institute (Dutch: Nederlands Vormgevingsinstituut) is a former institute for the promotion of design in the Netherlands. It was located in the premises of the former Museum Fodor at Keizersgracht in Amsterdam. Its mission was to stimulate high quality design in the Netherlands, to stimulating the interest in it, and to encouraging discussion about the profession.

The organization was founded in 1993 and succeeded by the Premsela Dutch Platform for Design and Fashion ten years later in 2003. That in turn became part of Het Nieuwe Instituut in Rotterdam in 2013.

== Initiatives ==
Over the years the institute initiated and participated in numerous smaller and some larger initiatives in the field of design, including exhibitions, conferences, publications and working on networks. This national initiative also collaborated with the existing professional organizations in the field of applied art, interior design, industrial design, architecture, etc.

=== Theo Limperg prize ===
The institute managed the Theo Limperg Prize. This design award was established in 1988 by the stichting industrieel ontwerpen Nederland (ioN) to promote and stimulate originality in industrial design and design. In the 1990s the prize had been awarded once every two years.

=== Doors of Perception ===
In 1993 the institute organized the first Doors of Perception conference in the RAI Amsterdam in collaboration with Stichting Mediamatic and the Amsterdam Society for Old and New Media. The first year about two hundred specialists in the field of new media and computer networks worked together with experts in sustainability changed ideas about a more sustainable world. The conference was originally planned at the Stedelijk Museum Amsterdam, but was moved a bigger location because of the big interests.

=== Droog Design collection ===
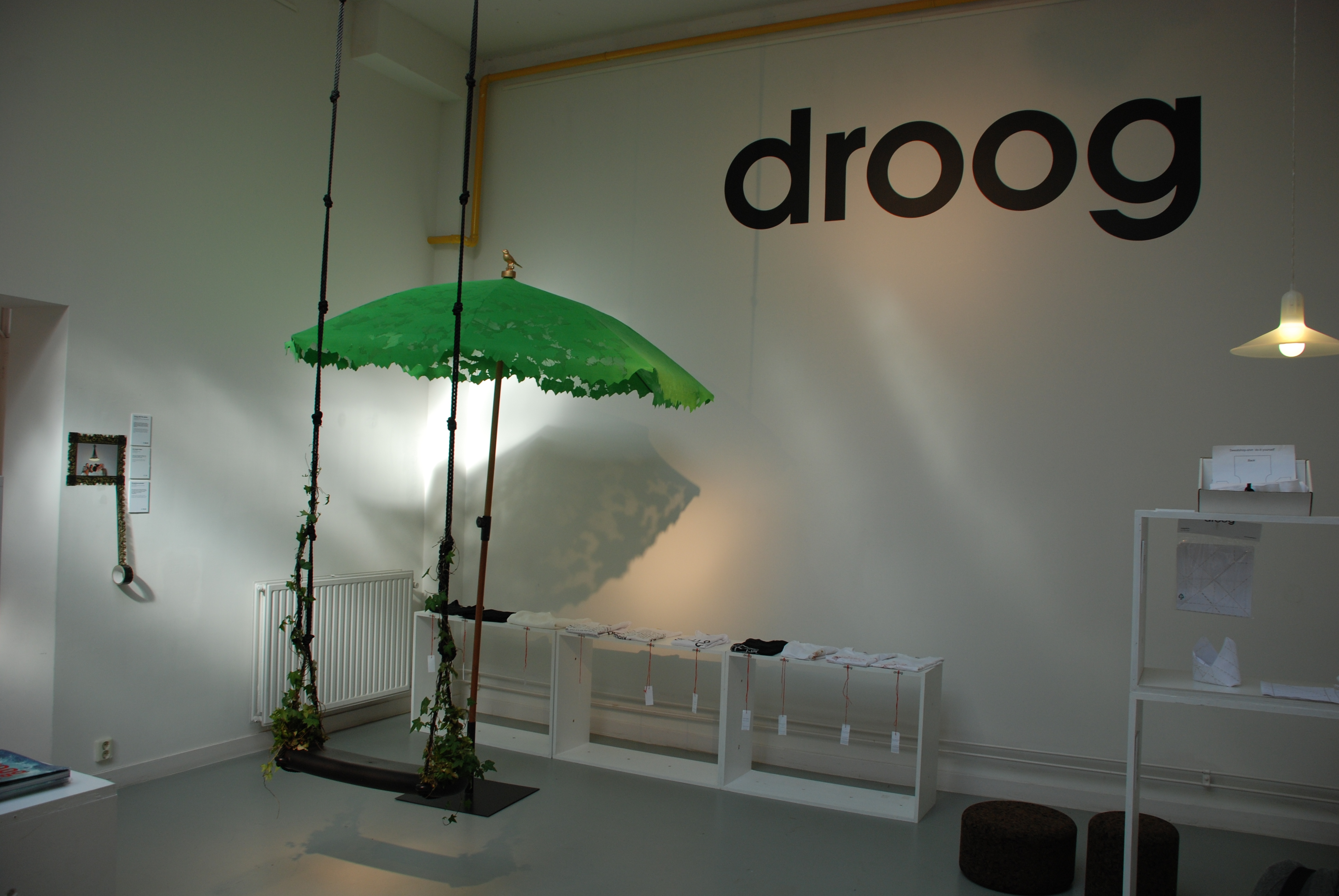
Droog Design collection

In the year 1994 the Droog Design collective was founded by Renny Ramakers and Gijs Bakker to promote contemporary Dutch design at that time. The Netherlands Design Institute has supported this initiative from the outset, including the joint presentation at the international Milan Furniture Fair in Milan in 1993, 1994, and 1995.

=== New York Museum of Modern Art ===
Another initiative was the interior design of the New York Museum of Modern Art restaurant by young Dutch designers. The MoMA had commissioned Opera architects to select a number of artists and designers. Eventually Piet Hein Eek supplied chairs and tables, Rody Graumans his characteristic lamp bulb lamp, Joep van Lieshout the bar and serving trolleys, Henk Stallinga installed the light installation 'een m2 gezelligheid'(a square metre of cosiness) and Jos van der Meulen his paper bags. This initiative was supported by the Netherlands Design Institute, a Dutch ministry and the Dutch embassy.

=== Rotterdam design prize ===
The Rotterdam Design Prize was established in 1993, partly on the recommendation of the Netherlands Design Institute. The prize was awarded annually from 1993 to 1997, after which it became a biennial prize.

In addition to the Rotterdam design prize, the institute has also contributed to the European Design Award.

== See also ==
- Transgenerational design
