= Premsela Dutch Platform for Design and Fashion =

- Predecessor: Netherlands Design Institute
- Successor: Het Nieuwe Instituut
- Location: Prinses Irenestraat 19, Amsterdam
- Origins: From 2002 to 2013
- Region served: na
- Key people: Dingeman Kuilman
- Website: premsela.hetnieuweinstituut.nl

The Premsela Dutch Platform for Design and Fashion was a Dutch institute for the promotion of design and fashion in the Netherlands from 2002 to 2013.

This organization was named after Benno Premsela. It succeeded the Netherlands Design Institute and in 2013 merged into Het Nieuwe Instituut.

== History ==
=== Foundation ===
The Premsela institute started in September 2002, about two years after its predecessor the Netherlands Design Institute had closed their doors due to the recommendations by the Raad voor Cultuur. The State Secretary for Culture and Media in those days, Rick van der Ploeg, them ordered a government advisory committee to determine how the design sector in the Netherlands could be supported.

The government advisory committee determined the need for more synergy in the societal, cultural and economic sectors around the field of design. In order to establish some effective government control over the sector it was thought that a new institute should cover multiple specialisms in the field. In new Premsela institute was to be located in Amsterdam.

=== Platform 21, center for creation ===
In 2005 at the Zuidas, Amsterdam Premsela opened a new design center, called Platform 21. It was intended to be a meeting point for the public, designers and industry."

The center was located in the renovated St. Nikolaaskapel in the Prinses Irenestraat, and contained spaces for exhibitions, and for lectures, debates and workshops. Platform 21 was going to be a design museum without its own collection. Exhibitions would be created with art and design works of other museums.

In those days there were plans as well for a new design museum about 6.000 square meters located near the World Trade Center (Amsterdam). The plan of this museum was developed by Reyn van der Lugt, curator of the Netherlands Architecture Institute.

=== Other activities ===
In 2010 the Amsterdam conference on Redesigning Design was organized in cooperation with Creative Commons Netherlands, and the Waag Society.

The later editions of the Rotterdam Design Prize were organized by Stichting Designprijs Rotterdam, Museum Boijmans Van Beuningen in cooperation with the Premsela, Dutch Institute for Design and Fashion.
