= Netherlands Architecture Institute =

Former cultural institute in Rotterdam, Netherlands

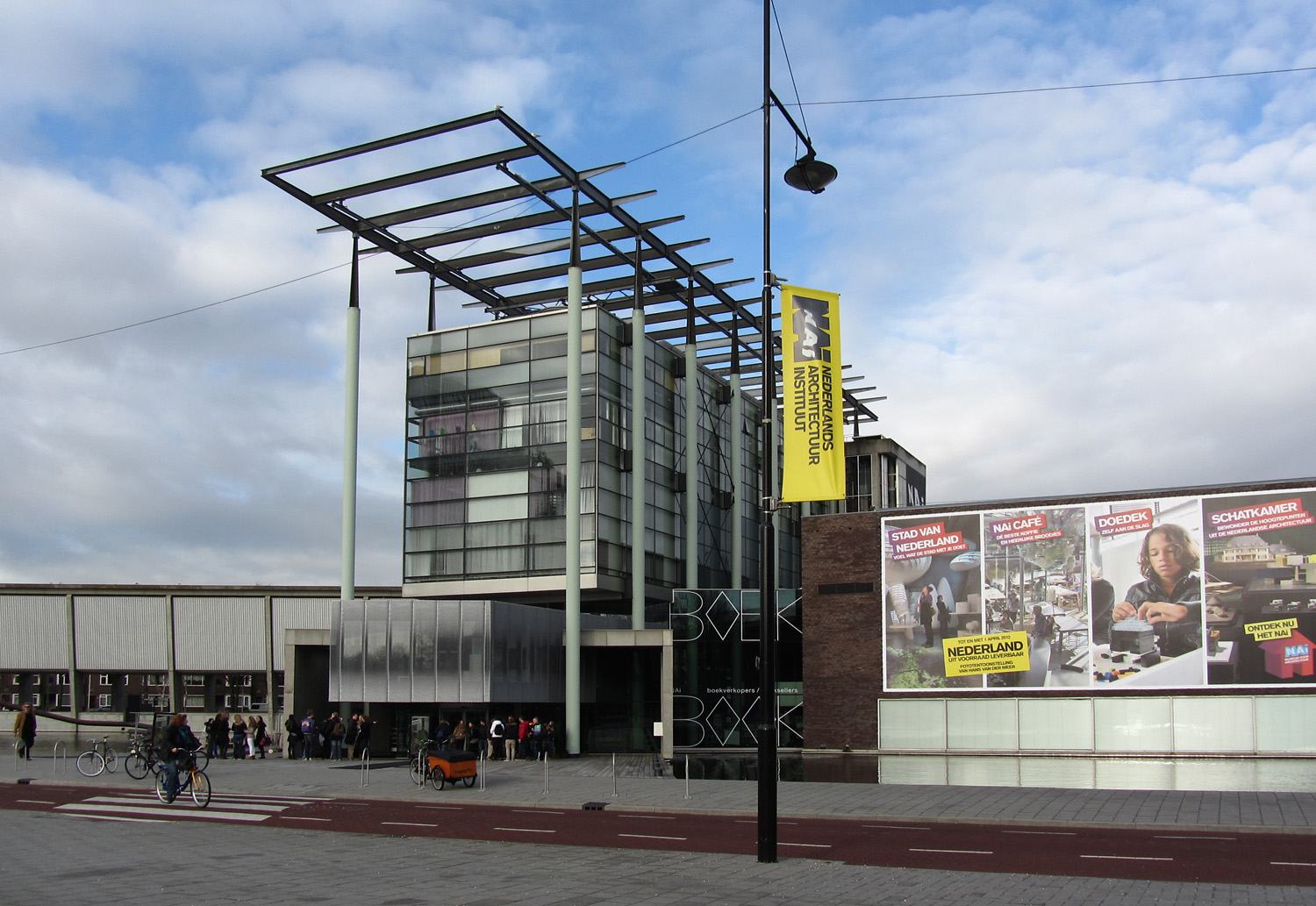
- Institute in 2012

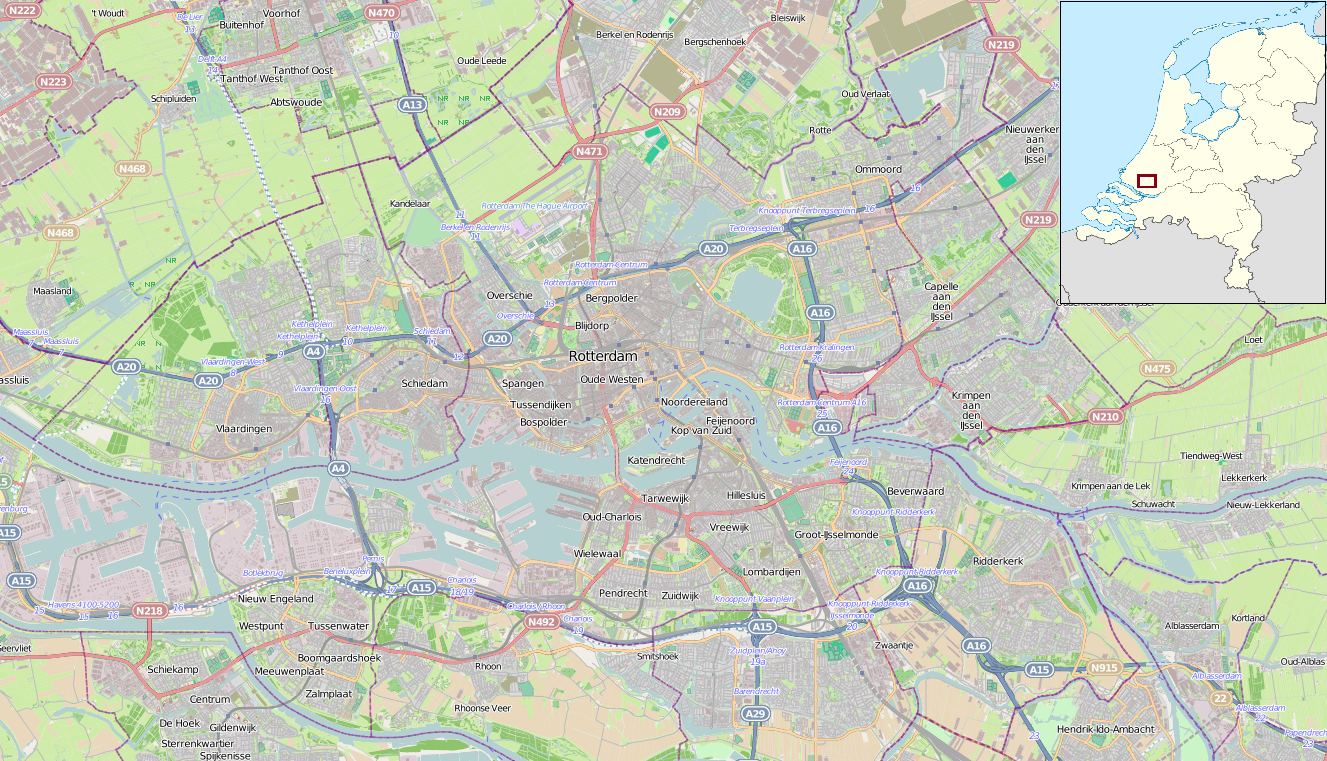
- Location in Rotterdam in the Netherlands
- Established: 1988
- Location: Museumpark 25; Rotterdam, Netherlands
- Coordinates: 51.914°N 4.471°E
- Type: Museum, Archives and Platform for architecture, urban planning, design
- Director: Ole Bouman
- Architect: Jo Coenen
- Website: www.nai.nl

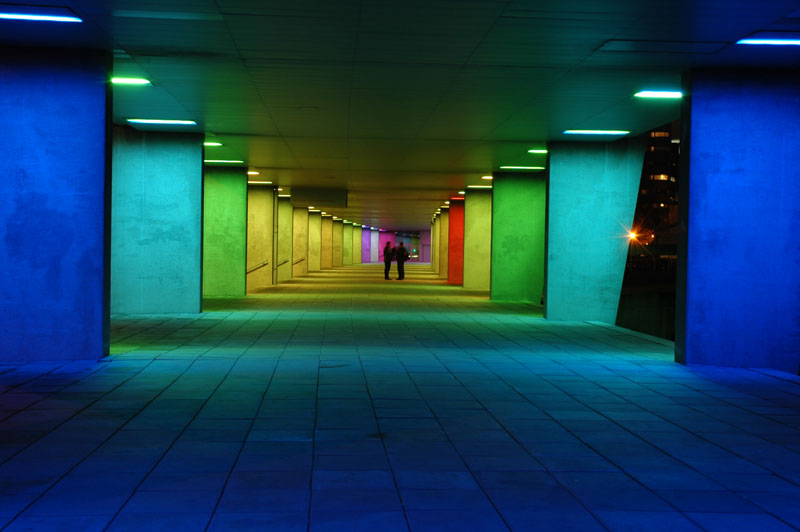
Gallery beneath the archives, with a light sculpture by Peter Struycken.

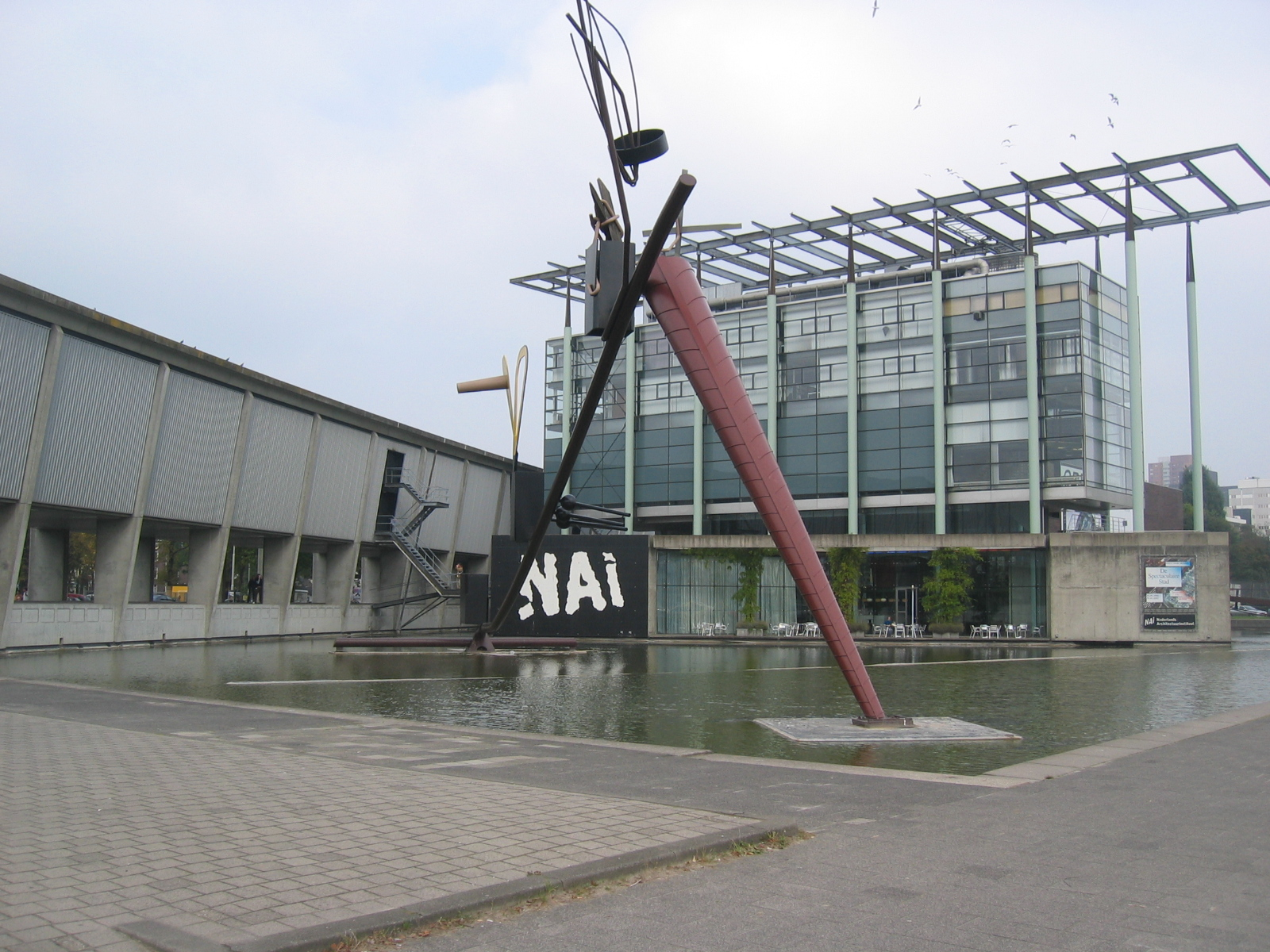
NAI Rotterdam. On the left the archives, on the right the office building.

The Netherlands Architecture Institute (NAI) was a cultural institute for architecture and urban development, which comprised a museum, an archive plus library and a platform for lectures and debates. The NAI was established in 1988 and was based in Rotterdam since 1993. It ceased to exist in 2013, when it became part of Het Nieuwe Instituut.

The NAI was a private organisation with a government brief, which was to manage the collection of archives that document the history of Dutch architecture. As a sector institute for architecture it was tasked with supporting the professional field. The building also housed a bookshop and a cafe.

== History ==
The idea of establishing a national architecture museum came about in 1912 when the Amsterdam architects’ association Architectura et Amicitia was obliged to rent an extra room in Hotel Parkzicht in Amsterdam to store its archive of drawings and models. Architect J.H.W. Leliman was a key advocate of an architecture museum. A committee comprising J. Ingenohl, J.H. de Groot and W.A.E. van der Pluym as members was set up to look into the possibilities of such a museum. In 1915, A et A members suggested storing the collection at the Rijksacademie in Amsterdam, and housing it in an independent museum at a later date. These ideas did not come to fruition, however.

In the 1980s, three cultural institutes collaborated to form the NAI. These were the Netherlands Architecture Documentation Centre (NDB), the Architecture Museum Foundation (SAM) and Stichting Wonen foundation. Following this, a controversy ensued between Amsterdam and Rotterdam as to where an architecture museum/institute would have to be based. Minister Brinkman opted for Rotterdam. Previous plans to set up the NAI in the vacant library at Botersloot were abandoned. The NAI found temporary accommodation in a building at Westersingel before the construction of a new building started.

== The building ==
In 1988, a competition was held among six architects to find an architect for a new building. These were: Jo Coenen, Rem Koolhaas, Benthem Crouwel Architekten, Wim Quist, Luigi Snozzi and Ralph Erskine. Koolhaas's design was the favourite among the specialist press and was also favoured by Riek Bakker, the director of Rotterdam's Department of Urban Development. However, the NAI awarded Jo Coenen the commission, the decisive factors being the blending of the design into the surroundings and the references to the history of architecture.

After an intensive period of renovation, the NAI opened its doors on 1 July 2011. The most salient part of the renovation was moving the entrance to the pond level. The restaurant was extended. An exhibition room and additional space for educational activities were also added. At the site of the original entrance is now the DoeDek, a hands-on area where visitors can experiment with Lego, large blocks and cut-outs. As the original building's architect, Jo Coenen was also responsible for its renovation.

== Sonneveld House Museum ==
Sonneveld House Museum is a house built in the Nieuwe Bouwen style, the Dutch branch of the International School of Modernism. It was furnished with furniture and materials made by W.H. Gispen, B. van der Leck and others. The house was designed in 1933 by architects’ firm Brinkman and Van der Vlugt for the Sonneveld family. Albertus Sonneveld was one of the directors of the Van Nelle factory.

The Rotterdam Stichting Bevordering van Volkskracht (a foundation for the enhancement of popular health, welfare and culture in the city) bought the museum house in 1977. A form of collaboration has existed between Volkskracht and the NAI since February 1999. The house was restored and opened to the public in 2001. The restoration work was done by architects’ firm Molenaar & Van Winden, with the NAI taking on the refurnishing work.

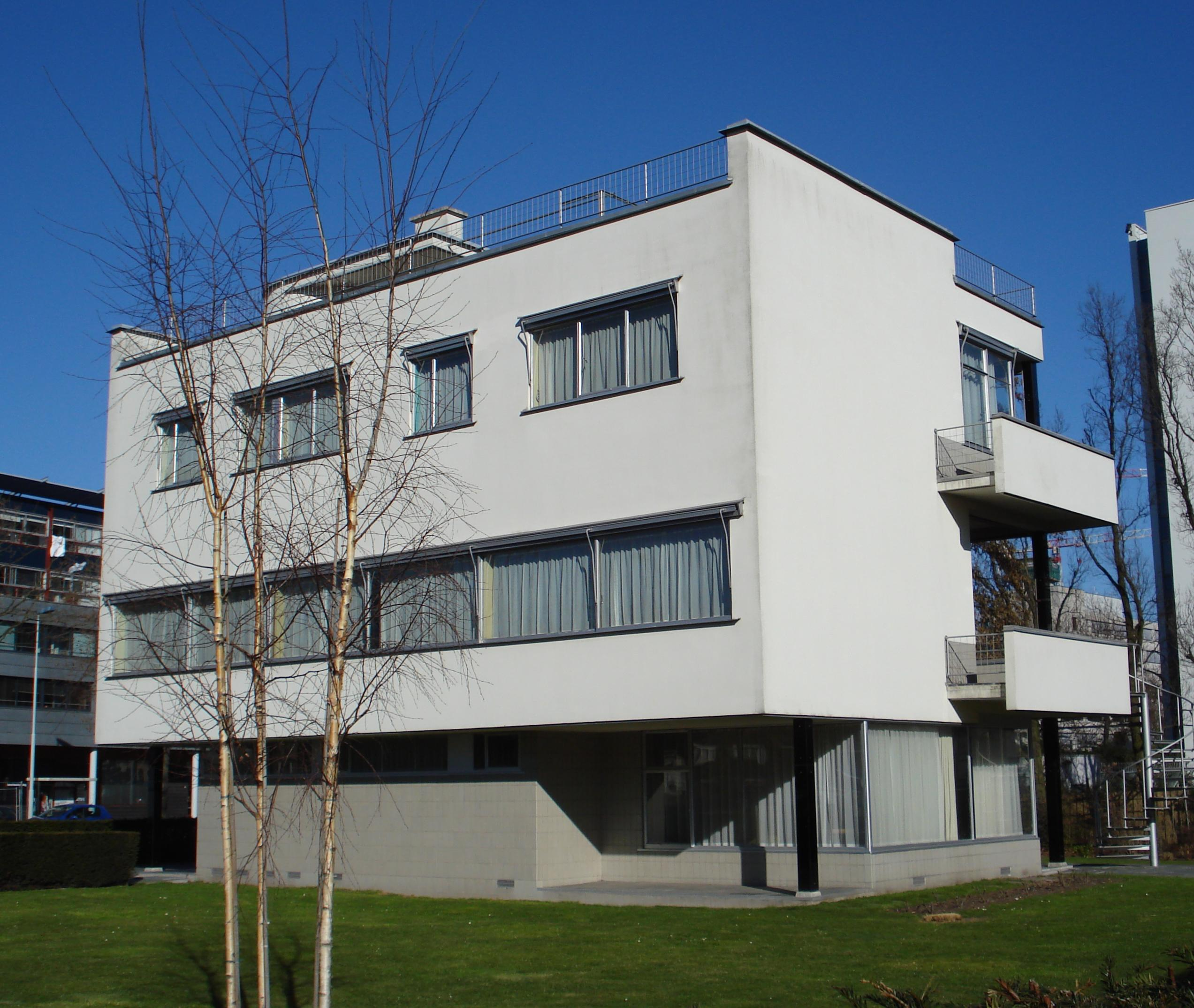
Sonneveld House Museum

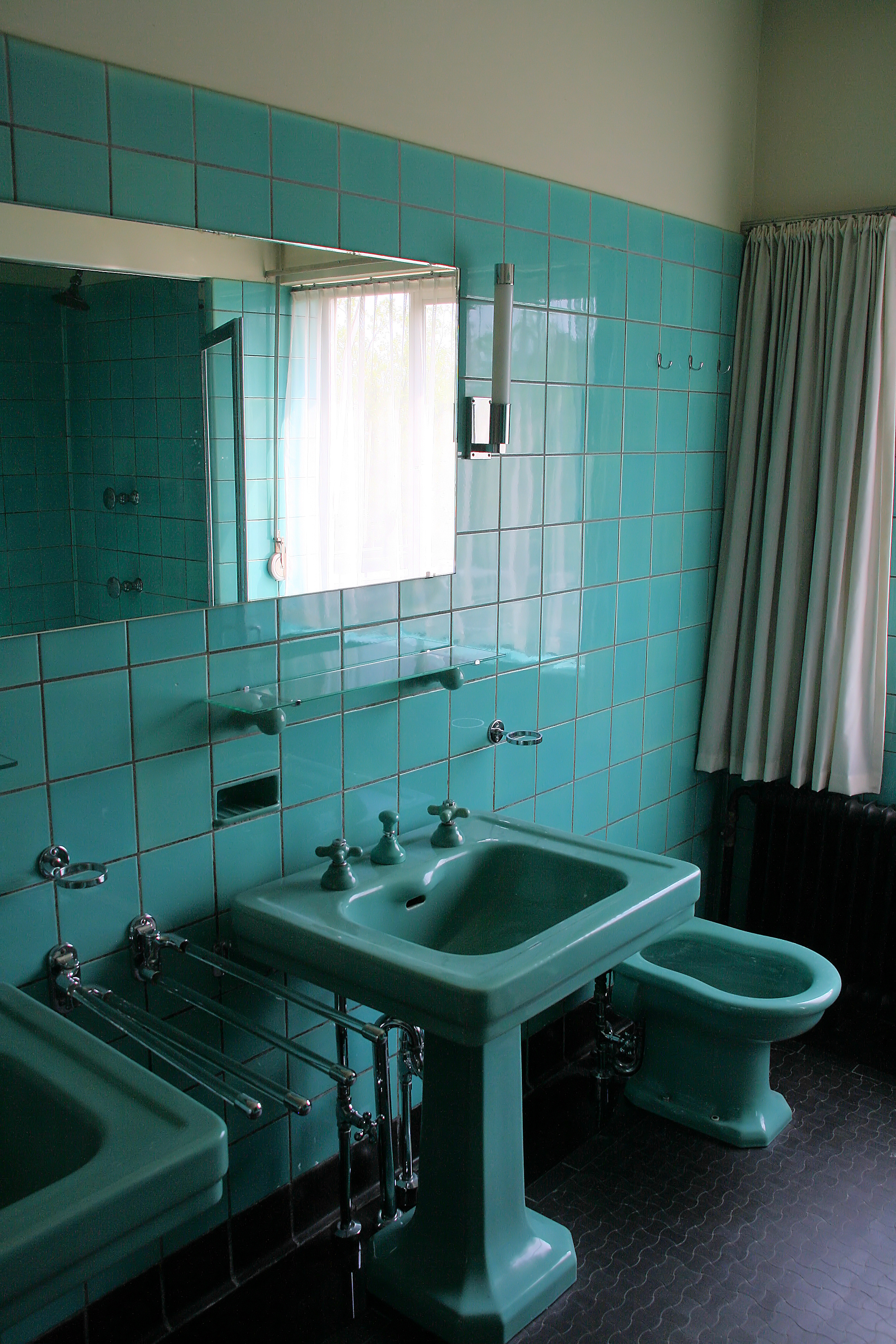
Sonneveld House Museum - Bathroom

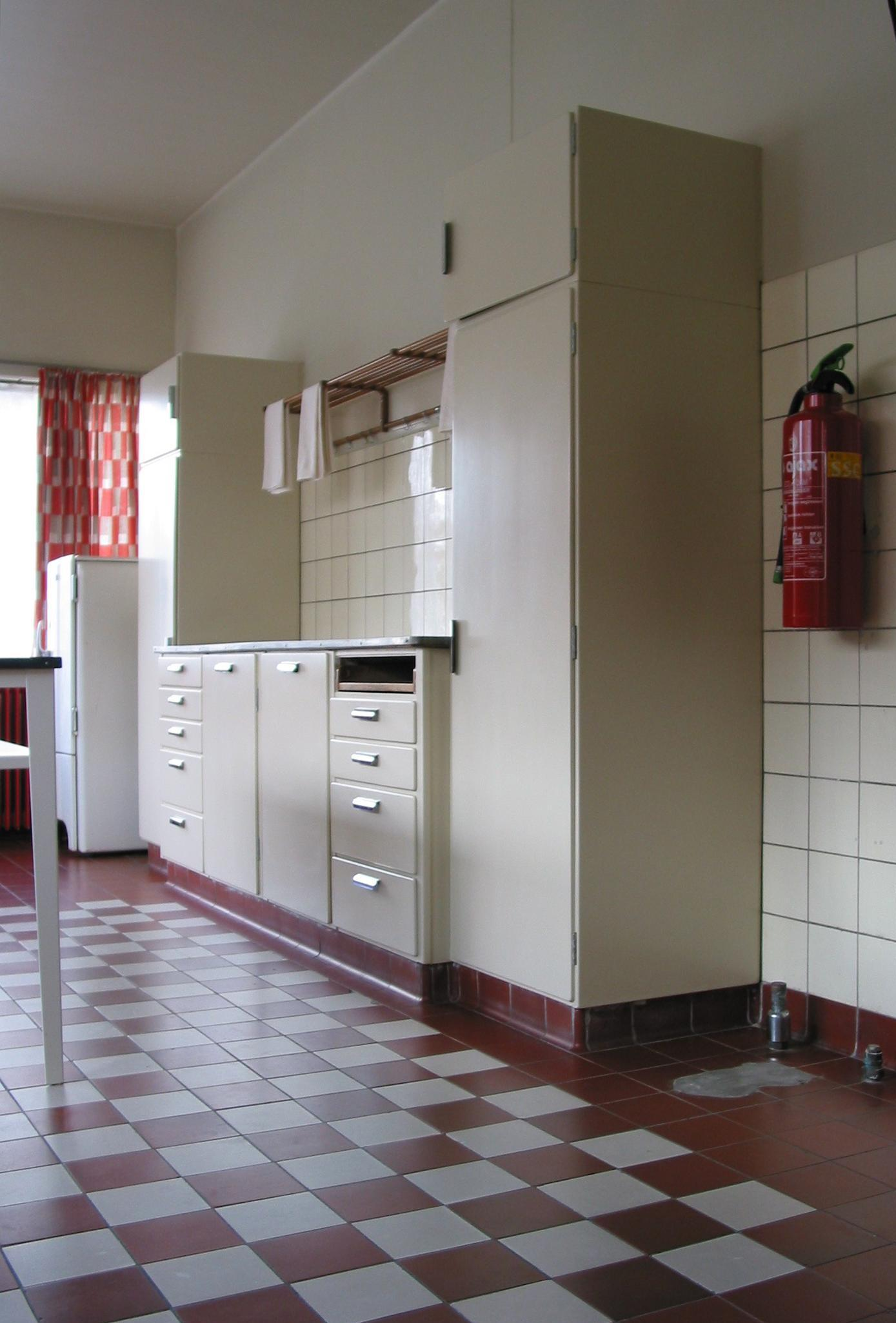
Sonneveld House Museum - Kitchen

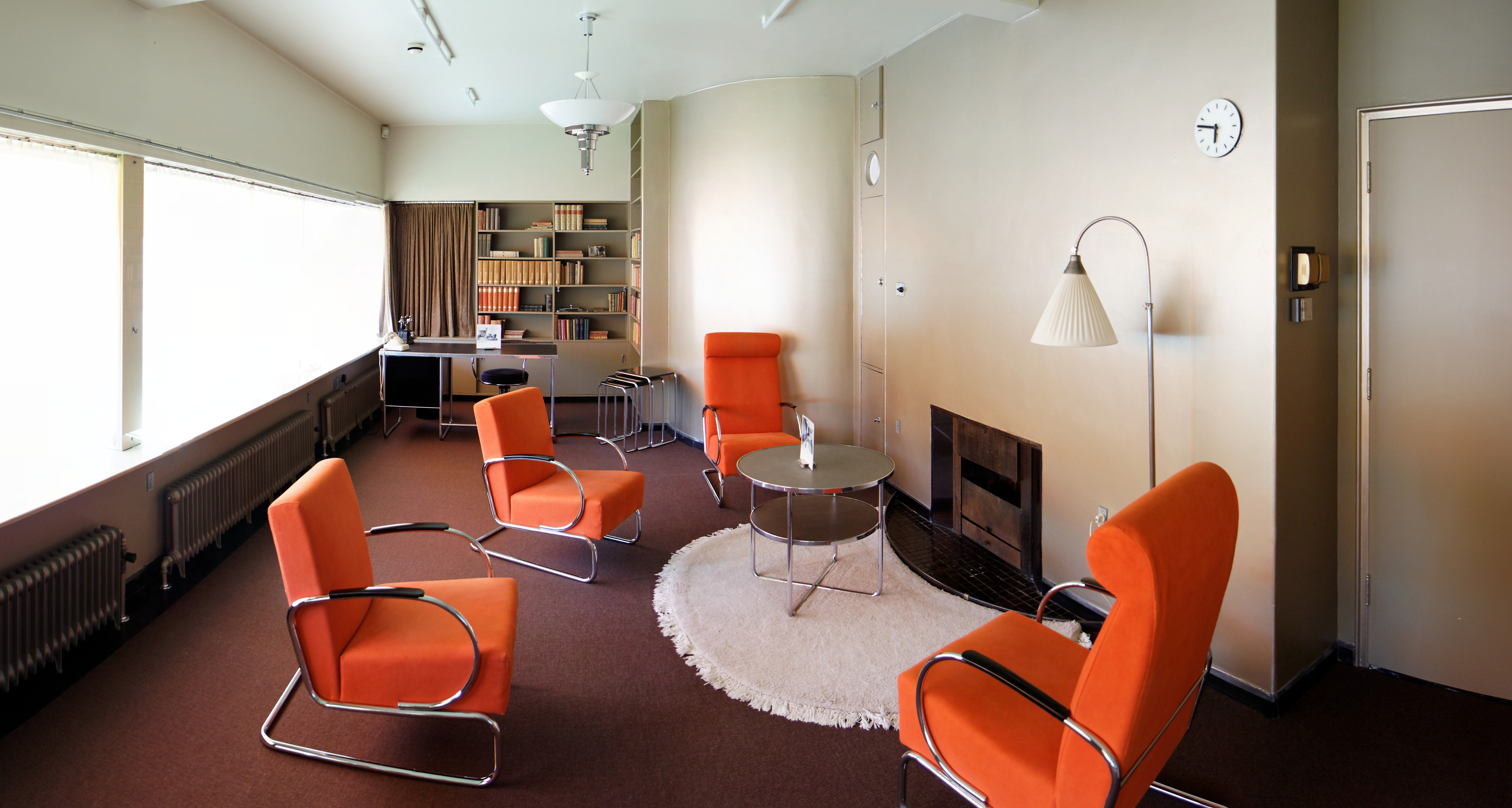
Sonneveld House Museum - Library

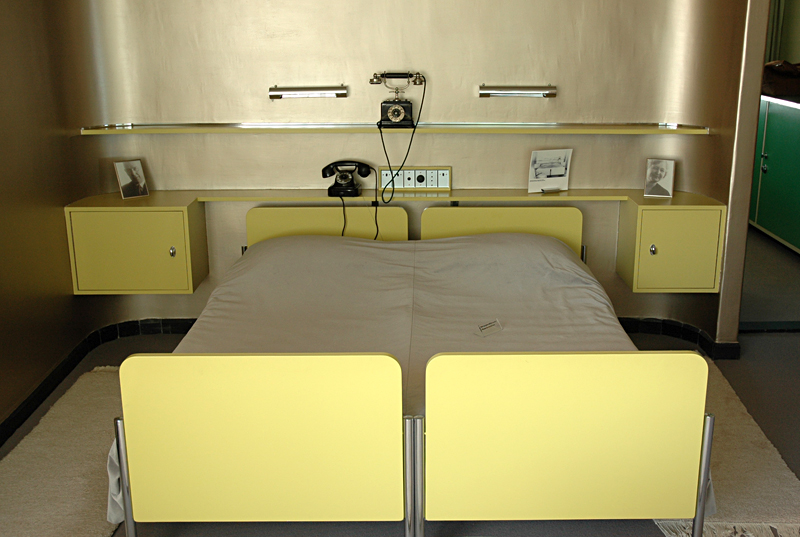
Sonneveld House Museum - Bedroom

== The collection ==
Private individuals started collecting architectural archives as early as the end of the nineteenth century. One of these was the Architecture Museum Foundation (SAM). In the 1970s, the government became interested in these archives, setting up the Netherlands Architecture Documentation Centre (NDB) as part of the Rijksdienst voor de Monumentenzorg, the Netherlands Department for Conservation. When the archives were transferred to the NDB, they officially became state property. The NAI's archive collection is still a national collection.

The libraries of the Academie van Bouwkunst Amsterdam (Amsterdam Academy of Architecture), the Bond van Nederlandse Architecten BNA (the Royal Institute of Dutch Architects) and Stichting Wonen, a consumer organisation for information on sustainable living, were added to the NDB's collection. The collection now houses some 18 kilometres of archive material. It also contains over 500 archives and collections of Dutch architects, organisations and educational institutes in the field of architecture and urban development, and comprises drawings, sketches, models, documentation, correspondence and photos. The internationally focused library contains about 60,000 volumes.

The NAI houses the Stichting BONAS foundation, (Stichting Bibliografieën en Oeuvrelijsten Nederlandse Architecten en Stedebouwkundigen, which translates as Bibliographies and Lists of Works of Dutch Architects and Urban Designers). Working on the basis of archive and literature study, this organisation reconstructs the work of Dutch designers from 1790 to the present and publishes it in book form.

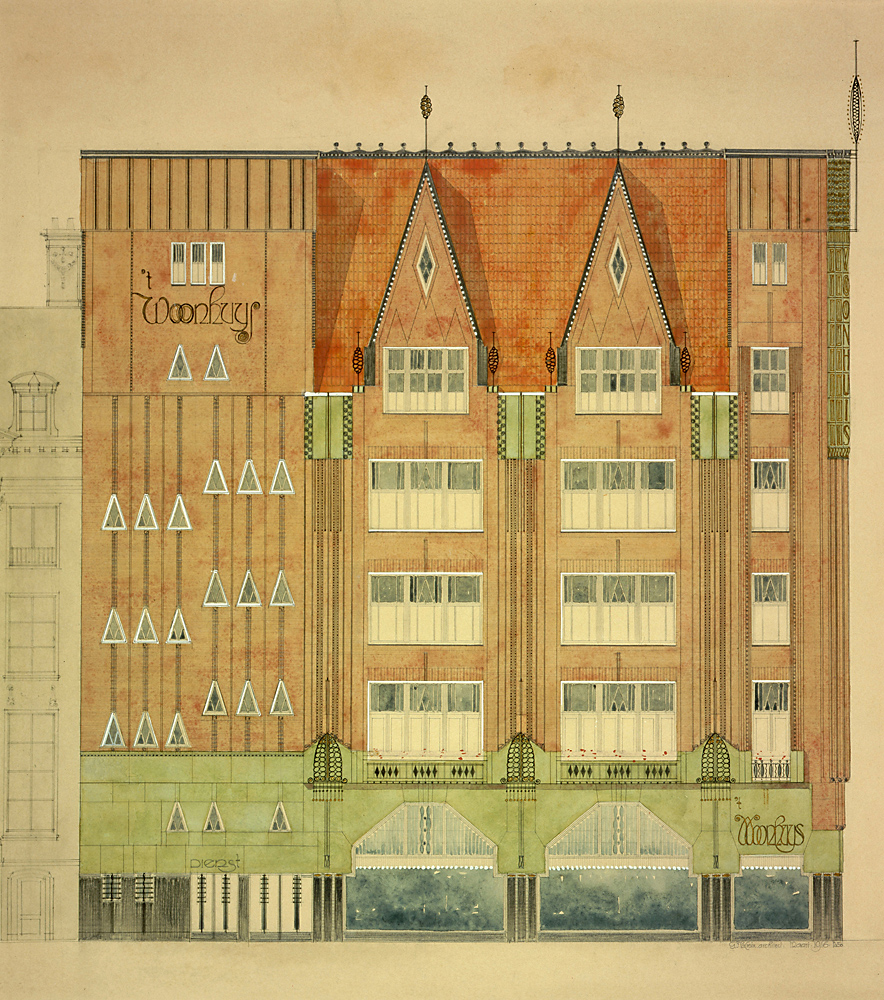
G.F. La Croix

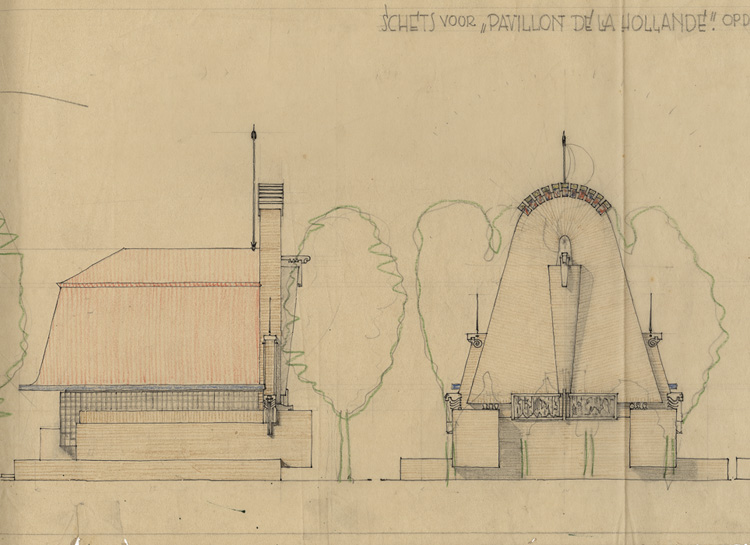
J.F. Staal

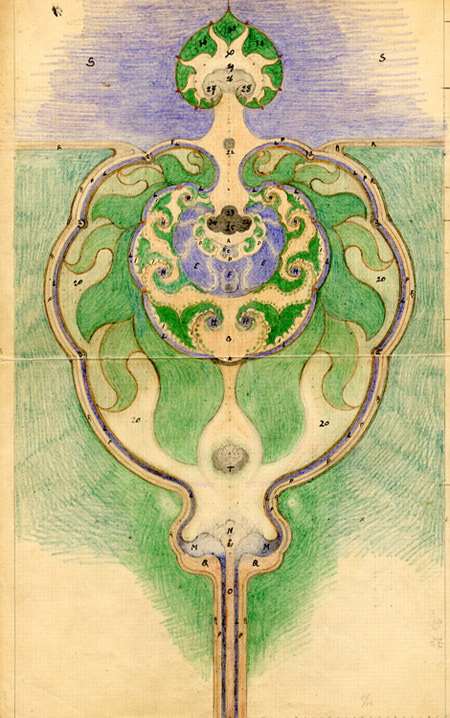
J.M.L. Lauweriks

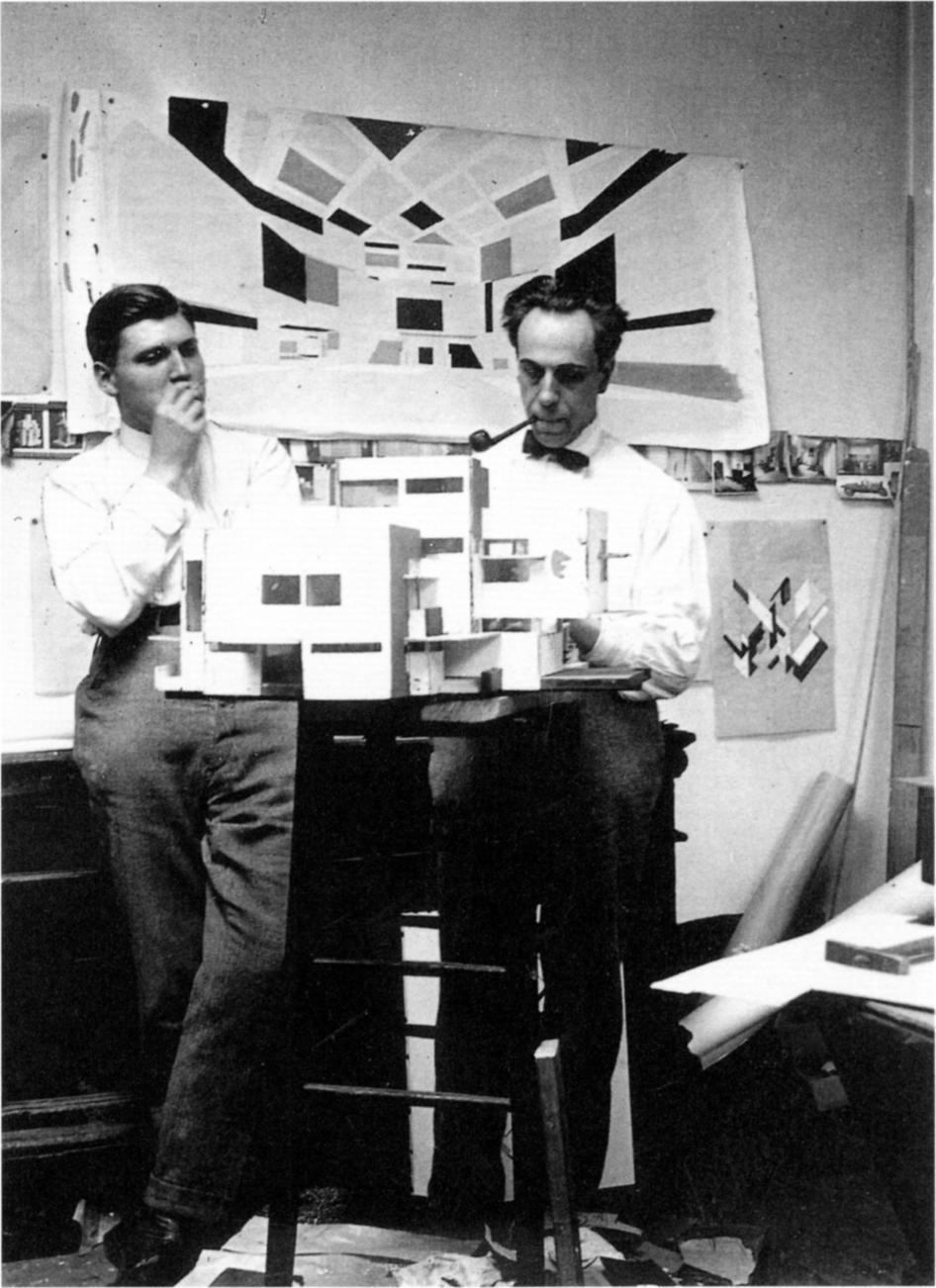
Portrait of C. van Eesteren and Th. van Doesburg

== Exhibitions ==
The NAI organised exhibitions about the designed environment: about architecture, urban development, design and spatial planning.

From 5 February until 24 April 2000, an exhibition called The Function of the Form – Van den Broek & Bakema Architecture and Urban Design exhibited the work of architects Jaap Bakema and Jo van den Broek, who were in practice together. The exhibition which included original drawings and models, photographs, film footage, and audio tapes, and was the largest survey of their work to date.

Other exhibitions included: Polders (2005), China Contemporary (2006), Wijdeveld: plan the impossible (2006), From Cuypers to Coenen (2007), Le Corbusier (2007), Shape our country (2009), Disputed City (2010), and Architecture of Consequence (2011). In addition to temporary exhibitions there were two (semi)permanent exhibitions: Stad van Nederland (Dutchville) and De Schatkamer (Treasury). Dutchville was about how the city is perceived and about its beautiful and slightly less appealing aspects. Opened in September 2011, the Treasury displayed masterpieces from the collection in an exhibition space designed by Rem Koolhaas, which was opened in September 2011.

== Platform ==
To promote its innovation agenda 'Architecture of Consequence', the NAI organises platform activities such as lectures and debates both in the Netherlands and abroad. What role can architecture play in solving social problems? This concerns topics such as food production, the social climate, renewable energy, alternative use of space, social cohesion and value creation. A 'matchmaking' programme brings together expertise on these subjects so as to find approaches to spatial tasks such as environmental issues or housing shortages. Studying and discussing these tasks puts them onto local and international agendas. The matchmaking programme focuses primarily on India and China.

== Education ==
The NAI offers programmes for primary and secondary education. It also works with various universities and universities of applied sciences on enhancing various subjects, study assignments, excursions and guided tours. Everyone can work hands-on on the DoeDek using large building blocks, Lego and cut-outs. Classes for children, supervised by architects and scientists, are to be held from February 2012.

== UAR (Urban Augmented Reality) ==
The NAI introduced UAR on 30 June 2010. UAR is an abbreviation for Urban Augmented Reality. It was a free-of-charge 3D architecture application that used augmented reality, that is, a layer of information was added to reality. In UAR, the existing, built environment is supplemented by a historical, a future, or an alternative layer using 3D models. UAR shows us what is not there, what the city used to look like, by showing us buildings that have since disappeared. The city as it could have been, using models and drawings to display alternative designs that never made it. And the city as it will become, using artist's impressions of future projects. The collections of various institutes and heritage organisations including the NAI's own collection were used for this. UAR covered the cities of Rotterdam, Amsterdam, Utrecht, The Hague, Breda, Haarlem, and Gouda.

== NAiM | Bureau Europa ==
On 2 September 2006, the NAI opened an annexe in Maastricht, in the Wiebengahal, which adjoins the Bonnefanten Museum, in the Céramique district. As of April 2009, this NAiM/Bureau Europa acquired independent status. Since 2013 the new name is Bureau Europa.

== NAI Publishers ==
NAI Publishers originated from the NAI's publication department but has been an independent company for 15 years now. The company specialises in publishing books on architecture, urban development, spatial planning, visual arts, photography and design. NAI Publishers’ bookshop was located in the NAI building. July 2012 NAI Publishers merged with 010 Publishers, a similar publisher, on a new location in Rotterdam. The name of the merger is nai010 publishers.

== Merger ==
State Secretary Halbe Zijlstra designated the NAI as one of the organisations that were going to form the new institute for the Creative Industry on 1 January 2013. That date the NAI merged with Stichting Premsela, the Netherlands Institute for Design and Fashion (Design sector institute) and Virtueel Platform (E-culture knowledge institute). The name of the merger is Het Nieuwe Instituut, The New Institute.

== Board of Management and Supervisory Board ==
The last management of the NAI comprised Ole Bouman (general director) and Peter Haasbroek (business director). The members of the Supervisory Board were: Hans Andersson (chairman), Karin Laglas (treasurer), Jeanne van Heeswijk, Leon Ramakers, Dirk Sijmons, Nathalie de Vries and Joop van der Leeuw.

General Directors NAI
	from	until
Adri Duijvesteijn	1988	1994
Hein van Haaren	1994	1996
Kristin Feireiss	1996	2001
Aaron Betsky	2001	2006
Ole Bouman	2006	2013
