= Transgenerational design =

Making products and environments compatible with human aging

Transgenerational design is the practice of making products and environments compatible with those physical and sensory impairments associated with human aging and which limit major activities of daily living. The term transgenerational design was coined in 1986, by Syracuse University industrial design professor James J. Pirkl to describe and identify products and environments that accommodate, and appeal to, the widest spectrum of those who would use them—the young, the old, the able, the disabled—without penalty to any group. The transgenerational design concept emerged from his federally funded design-for-aging research project, Industrial design Accommodations: A Transgenerational Perspective. The project's two seminal 1988 publications provided detailed information about the aging process; informed and sensitized industrial design professionals and design students about the realities of human aging; and offered a useful set of guidelines and strategies for designing products that accommodate the changing needs of people of all ages and abilities.

== Overview ==
The transgenerational design concept establishes a common ground for those who are committed to integrating age and ability within the consumer population. Its underlying principle is that people, including those who are aged or impaired, have an equal right to live in a unified society.

Transgenerational design practice recognizes that human aging is a continuous, dynamic process that starts at birth and ends with death, and that throughout the aging process, people normally experience occurrences of illness, accidents and declines in physical and sensory abilities that impair one's independence and lifestyle. But most injuries, impairments and disabilities typically occur more frequently as one grows older and experiences the effects of senescence (biological aging). Four facts clarify the interrelationship of age with physical and sensory vulnerability:

1. young people become old
2. young people can become disabled
3. old people can become disabled
4. disabled people become old

Within each situation, consumers expect products and services to fulfill and enhance their lifestyle, both physically and symbolically. Transgenerational design focuses on serving their needs through what Cagan and Vogel call "a value oriented product development process". They note that a product is "deemed of value to a customer if it offers a strong effect on lifestyle, enabling features, and meaningful ergonomics" resulting in products that are "useful, usable, and desirable" during both short and long term use by people of all ages and abilities.

Transgenerational design is "framed as a market-aware response to population aging that fulfills the need for products and environments that can be used by both young and old people living and working in the same environment".

== Benefits ==
Transgenerational design benefits all ages and abilities by creating a harmonious bond between products and the people that use them. It satisfies the psychological, physiological, and sociological factors desired—and anticipated—by users of all ages and abilities:

- Safety
- Comfort
- Convenience
- Usability
- Ergonomics
- Accommodation

Transgenerational design addresses each element and accommodates the user—regardless of age or ability—by providing a sympathetic fit and unencumbered ease of use. Such designs provide greater accessibility by offering wider options and more choices, thereby preserving and extending one's independence, and enhancing the quality of life for all ages and abilities—at no group's expense.

Transgenerational designs accommodate rather than discriminate and sympathize rather than stigmatize. They do this by:

- bridging the transitions across life's stages
- responding to the widest range of individual differences
- helping people remain active and independent
- adapting to changing sensory and physical needs
- maintaining one's dignity and self-respect
- enabling one to choose the appropriate means to accomplish activities of daily living

== History ==
Transgenerational design emerged during the mid-1980s coincident with the conception of universal design, an outgrowth of the disability rights movement and earlier barrier-free concepts. In contrast, transgenerational design grew out of the Age Discrimination Act of 1975, which prohibited "discrimination on the basis of age in programs and activities receiving Federal financial assistance", or excluding, denying or providing different or lesser services on the basis of age. The ensuing political interest and debate over the Act's 1978 amendments, which abolished mandatory retirement at age 65, made the issues of aging a major public policy concern by injecting it into the mainstream of societal awareness.

=== Background ===
At the start of the 1980s, the oldest members of the population, having matured during the Great Depression, were being replaced by a generation of Baby Boomers, steadily reaching middle age and approaching the threshold of retirement. Their swelling numbers signaled profound demographic changes ahead that would steadily expand the aging population throughout the world.

Advancements in medical research were also changing the image of old age—from a social problem of the sick, poor, and senile, whose solutions depend on public policy—to the emerging reality of an active aging population having vigor, resources, and time to apply both.

Responding to the public's growing awareness, the media, public policy, and some institutions began to recognize the impending implications. Time and Newsweek devoted cover stories to the "Greying of America". Local radio stations began replacing their rock-and-roll formats with music targeted to more mature tastes. The Collegiate Forum (Dow Jones & Co., Inc.) devoted its Fall 1982 issue entirely to articles on the aging work force. A National Research Conference on Technology and Aging, and the Office of Technological Assessment of the House of Representatives, initiated a major examination of the impact of science and technology on older Americans”.

In 1985, the National Endowment for the Arts, the Administration on Aging, the Farmer's Home Administration, and the Department of Housing and Urban Development signed an agreement to improve building, landscape, product and graphic design for older Americans, which included new research applications for old age that recognized the potential for making products easier to use by the elderly, and therefore more appealing and profitable.

=== Development ===
In 1987, recognizing the implications of population aging, Syracuse University’s Department of Design, All-University Gerontology Center, and Center for Instructional Development initiated and collaborated on an interdisciplinary project, Industrial Design Accommodations: A Transgenerational Perspective. The year-long project, supported by a Federal grant, joined the knowledge base of gerontology with the professional practice of industrial design.

The project defined "the three aspects of aging as physiological, sociological, and psychological; and divided the designer’s responsibility into aesthetic, technological, and humanistic concerns". The strong interrelationship between the physiological aspects of aging and industrial design's humanistic aspects established the project's instructional focus and categorized the physiological aspects of aging as the sensory and physical factors of vision, hearing, touch, and movement. This interrelationship was translated into a series of reference tables, which related specific physical and sensory factors of aging, and were included in the resulting set of design guidelines to:

- sensitize designers and design students to the aging process
- provide them with appropriate knowledge about this process
- accommodate the changing needs of our transgenerational population

The project produced and published two instructional manuals—one for instructors and one for design professionals—each containing a detailed set of "design guidelines and strategies for designing transgenerationalproducts". Under terms of the grant, instructional manuals were distributed to all academic programs of industrial design recognized by the National Association of Schools of Art and Design (NASAD).

=== Chronology ===
- 1988: The term ‘transgenerational design’ first appears to have been publicly recognized and acknowledged by the Bristol-Myers Company in its annual report, which stated, "The trend towards transgenerational design seems to be catching on in some fields", noting that “transgenerational design has the added advantage of circumventing the stigmatizing label of being ‘old’ ”.
- 1989: The results of the 1987 Federal grant project were first presented at the national conference, Exploration: Technological Innovations for an Aging Population, supported in part by the American Association of Retired Persons (AARP) and the National Institute on Aging. The proceedings focused “on current efforts to address the impact of technology and an aging population, identification of high impact issues and problems, innovative ideas, and potential solutions”.
- Also in 1989 Design News, the Japanese design magazine, introduced “the new concept of transgenerational design (for) coping with the needs of an aging population and its strategy”, stating that “the impact will soon be felt by all global institutions” and “alter the present course of industrial design practice and education”.
- 1990: The OXO company introduced the first group of 15 Good Grips kitchen tools to the U.S. Market. “These ergonomically-designed, transgenerational tools set a new standard for the industry and raised the bar to consumer expectation for comfort and performance”. Sam Farber, OXOs founder, stated that “population trends demand transgenerational products, products that will be useful to you throughout the course of your life” because “it extends the life of a product and its materials by anticipating the whole experience of the user”.
- 1991: The Fall issue of the Design Management Journal addressed the issue of “Responsible Design” and introduced the transgenerational design concept in the article, “Transgenerational Design: A Strategy Whose Time Has Arrived”. The article presented a description, the rationale, and examples of early transgenerational products, and offered “insights on the rationale and benefits of such a transgenerational approach”.
- 1993: The September–October issue of ‘’AARP The Magazine’’ exposed the transgenerational design concept to the readers in a featured article, “This Bold House”, describing the concept, details, and benefits of a transgenerational house. The article noted that “easy-grip handles, flat thresholds, and adjustable-height vanities are just the beginning in the world’s most accessible house,” providing families of all ages and abilities with “what they will want and need their whole lives”.
- In November, the transgenerational design concept was introduced in presentations to the European design community at the international symposiums, “Designing for Our Future Selves”, held at the Royal College of Art in London and the Netherlands Design Institute in Rotterdam.
- 1994: The book, Transgenerational Design: Products for an Aging Population (Pirkl 1994), may be regarded as the prime mover of the widespread acceptance and practice of the transgenerational design concept. It presented the first specialized content and photographic examples of transgenerational products and environments, offering “practical strategies in response to population aging, along with case study examples based on applying a better understanding of age-related capabilities”. It introduced the transgenerational design concept to the international design and gerontology communities, broadening the conventional idea of “environmental support” to include the product environment, sparking scholarly discussions and comparisons with other emerging concepts: (universal design, design for all, inclusive design, and gerontechnology).
- 1995: The transgenerational design concept was presented at the first of the ‘’International Guest Lecture Series by World Experts’’, sponsored by the European Design for Aging Network (DAN) held consecutively at five international symposiums, “Designing for Our Future Selves”: Royal College of Art, London, November 15; Eindhoven University of Technology, Eindhoven, November 16–19; The Netherlands Design Institute, Amsterdam, November 21; University of Art and Design, Helsinki, November 23–25; and National College of Art and Design, Dublin, November 26–29.
- 2000: “The Transgenerational House: A Case Study in Accessible Design and Construction” was presented in June at ‘’Designing for the 21st Century: An International Conference on Universal Design’’, held at the Rhode Island College of Art and Design, Providence, RI.
- 2007: Architectural Graphic Standards, published by the American Institute of Architects and commonly referred to as the “architects bible”, presented a “Transgenerational House” case study in its "Inclusive Design" section. Described as an “intricate exploration in how the execution of detailed thought can create a living environment that serves the young and old alike, across generations”, the study includes plans for the room layout, kitchen, laundry, master bath, adjustable-height vanity, and roll-in shower.
- 2012: The proliferation of transgenerational design has diminished the tendency to associate age and disability with deficit, decline and incompetence by providing a market-aware response to population aging and the need for living and work environments used by young and old people living and working in the same environment.

Continuing to emerge as a growing strategy for developing products, services and environments that accommodate people of all ages and abilities, "transgenerational design has been adopted by major corporations, like Intel, Microsoft and Kodak” who are “looking at product development the same way as designing products for people with visual, hearing and physical impairments,” so that people of any age can use them.

Discussions between designers and marketers are indicating that successful transgenerational design “requires the right balance of upfront research work, solid human factors analysis, extensive design exploration, testing and a lot of thought to get it right”, and that “transgenerational design is applicable to any consumer products company—from appliance manufacturers to electronics companies, furniture makers, kitchen and bath and mainstream consumer products companies”.

== See also ==
- Ageless computing
- Curb cut effect
- Development plan
- Disability rights movement
- Inclusion (disability rights)
- Inclusive design
- Sensory friendly
- Urban planning
