= Gert Staal =

Dutch designer

- Born: 1956 (age 69–70)
- Occupations: Furniture designer; gallery owner
- Known for: Deputy director Design Institute
- Website: Gert Staal

Gert Staal (born 1956) is a Dutch researcher, publicist and critic in the fields of design, architecture and urban design. Educated as linguist and art historian over the years he was active as journalist, editor, author, manager and teacher particularly in those fields of Dutch design.

== Biography ==
Staal was born in 1956, and received his MA in Dutch language and art history at the University of Amsterdam.

In 1981 Staal began working as a design journalist for de Volkskrant, where he wrote about design events on a nearly weekly basis. In late 1983, he moved to the NRC Handelsblad, where he continued to write about design-related topics for a period of more than five years. In the 1990s he continued to write occasionally for the NRC Handelsblad, for de Volkskrant, and for Trouw.

In the 1980s Staal had started writing and editing books on designers and design, and continued to do so over the years. In the next 40 years he wrote more than 50 publications. In the 1990s, he was chief editor at the Dutch design magazine Items for a while. When in 1993 the Netherlands Design Institute started, Staal was appointed deputy director under John Thackara. Later on he became a staff member of the Counsel for Culture, which advised the Dutch government on cultural matters.

Beside all these activities Staal taught the AKV St. Joost and the Design Academy Eindhoven and participated in numerous design research and development projects.

== Selected publications ==
- Gert Staal and Hester Wolters (eds.), Holland in Vorm: Dutch Design, 1945-1987, The Hague: Stichting Holland in Vorm, 1987.
- Thomas Widdershoven and Gert Staal, Boris en de paraplu. Centraal Museum, 1998. ISBN 90-73285-74-7.
- Gert Staal. Asking Questions: 10 Years of Architectural Design at the Gerrit Rietveld Academy. Rotterdam: 010 Publishers, 2004. ISBN 978-90-6450-531-7.
- Louise Schouwenberg, Gert Staal, Martijn Goedegebuure, eds. House of Concepts: Design Academy Eindhoven, Amsterdam: Frame Publishers, 2008. ISBN 978-90-77174-17-3
- Gert Staal and curator Anne van der Zwaag (ed.) Pastoe: 100 jaar vernieuwing in vormgeving, geschreven door designcriticus, 2013.
