= Ernst-Neufert-Haus =

Building in Darmstadt, Germany

Coordinates: 49.8758°N 8.6628°E

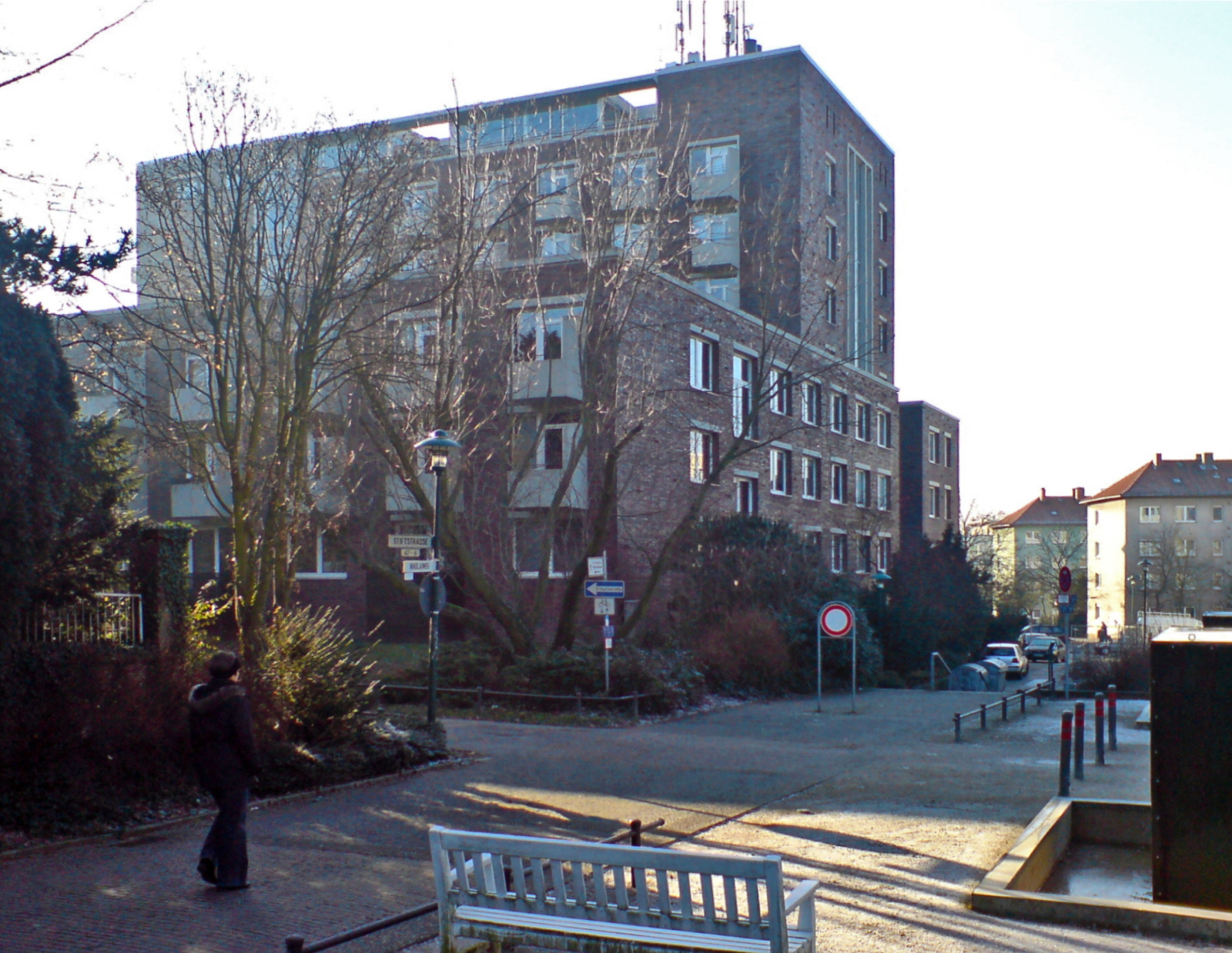

- Location within Hesse
- Former names: Ledigenwohnheim
- Alternative names: Meisterbau
- Etymology: Named after architect Ernst Neufert

General information
- Status: In use
- Type: Residential
- Architectural style: Modern
- Location: Darmstadt, Germany
- Current tenants: Restaurant (lower floor), apartments
- Named for: Ernst Neufert
- Year built: 1955
- Completed: 1955
- Opened: 1955

Technical details
- Material: Clinker

Design and construction
- Architect: Ernst Neufert
- Designations: Heritage protected
- Known for: Prime example of Ernst Neufert's style; part of the Meisterbau

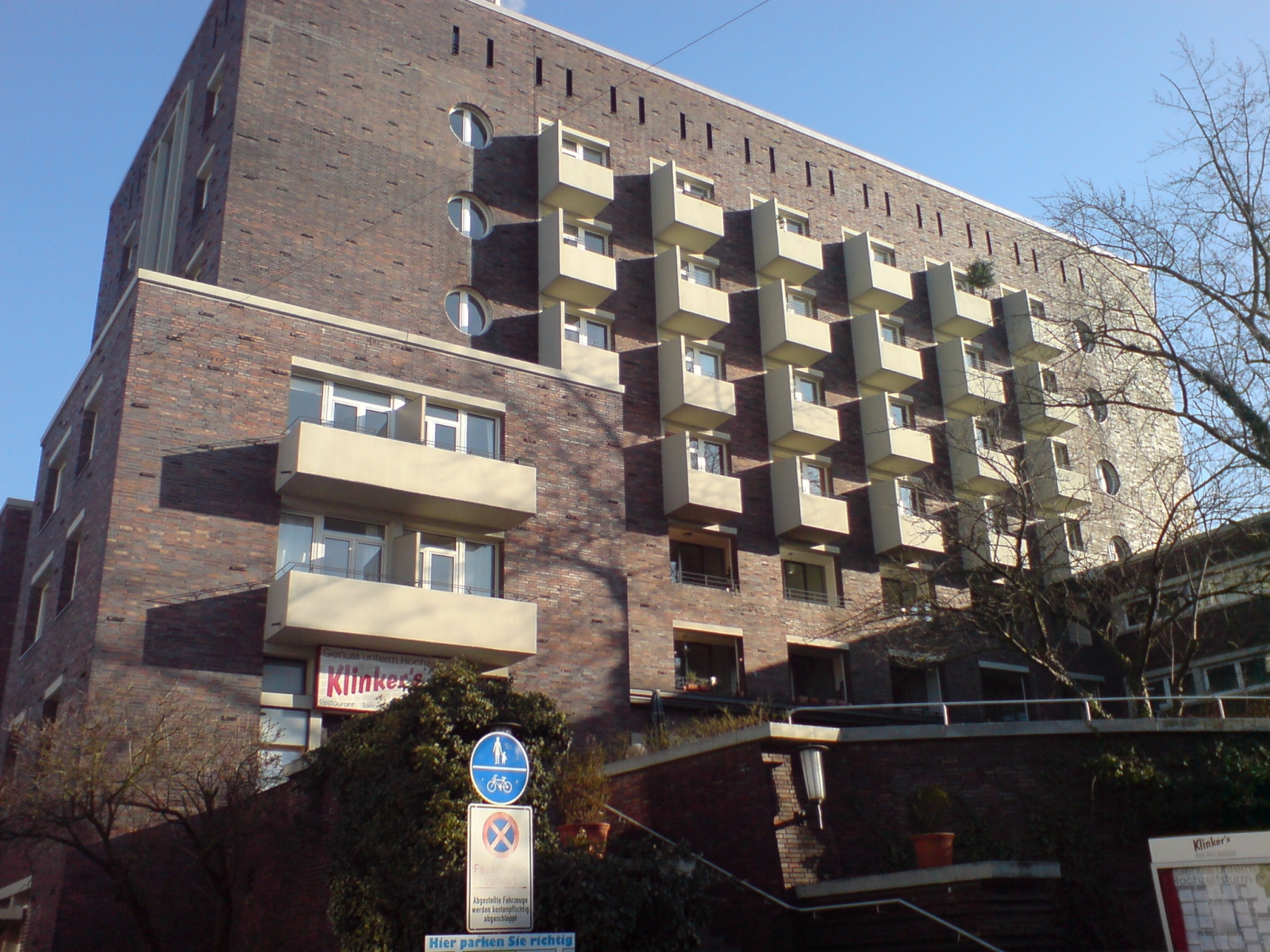
The staircase and building from the northwest.

The Ernst-Neufert-Haus (sometimes also known as the Meisterbau) is a massive, brown clinker-clad residential building in Darmstadt, Hesse, designed by Ernst Neufert. It was built in 1955 as the "Ledigenwohnheim" (single men's hostel) and was part of the 'Meisterbau' (Master Builder's) programme to give Darmstadt, which had lost much of its historical substance in World War II to bombing, a new architectural emphasis.

While the attempt to guide the newly burgeoning city into a stylistic direction failed, and the small rooms of Neufert's building were later redesigned to more typical apartments, the building is considered a prime example of his style, and is now heritage protected. A restaurant occupies part of the lower floor, reached via a large freestanding staircase on the western side.
