= Het Nieuwe Instituut =

Dutch cultural center

Nieuwe Instituut
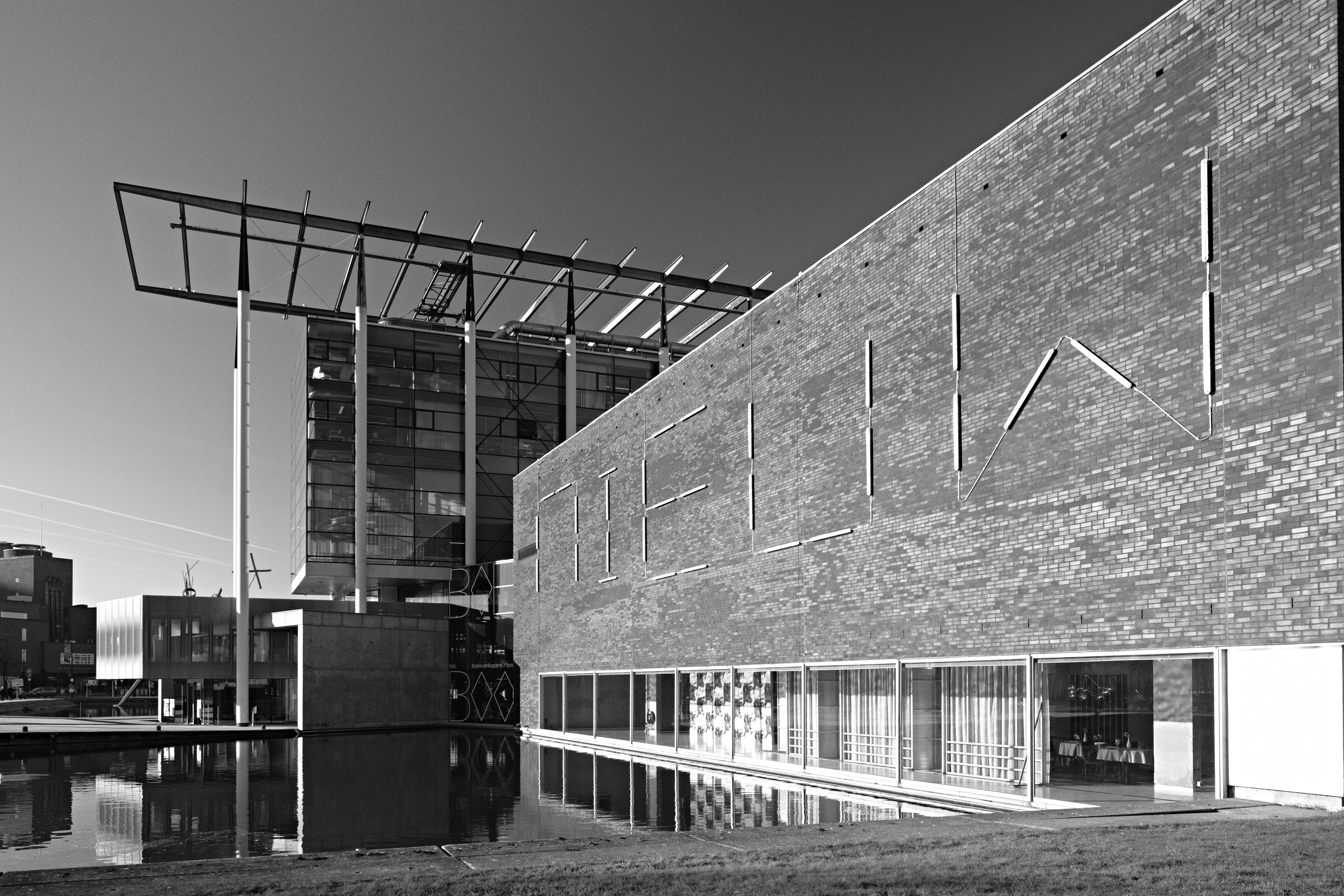
- Location: Rotterdam, the Netherlands
- Coordinates: 51°54′53″N 4°28′15″E
- Type: Cultural centre
- Architect: Jo Coenen
- Website: nieuweinstituut.nl

Nieuwe Instituut (NI, English: New Institute) is a cultural centre in Rotterdam, the Netherlands. It focuses on architecture, design, and digital culture. NI is in a building designed by Jo Coenen at Museumpark 25 in the centre of Rotterdam, adjacent to the Museum Boijmans Van Beuningen. The building contains a shop, exhibition space, study centre, and archive, as well as the Sonneveld House (a prime example of Nieuwe Zakelijkheid architecture), a pond, and a small park.

== Formation ==
Nieuwe Instituut (NI) formerly known as Het Nieuwe Instituut was formed in 2013, when then-secretary of state for Education, Culture, and Science Halbe Zijlstra ordered the merger of the Dutch institutes for architecture, design, and digital-culture. Thus the Netherlands Architecture Institute, Premsela Dutch Platform for Design and Fashion, and the Virtueel Platform were put together in the building at Museum Park 25, which was designed by Jo Coenen, and opened by Queen Beatrix in 1993.

== Facilities ==
At NI, exhibitions are presented in the Museum of Architecture, Design and Digital Culture. The building also houses the national collection for Dutch architecture and urban planning, an agency, a study centre, a bookshop and a café. The archive contains over 18 kilometres of architectural materials, including the personal collections of several Dutch architects.

The institution also owns the Sonneveld House Museum, which opened to the public after restoration and refurbishment work that recreated the original condition of the house and its interior.
