= Ernst Neufert =

German architect

- Born: Ernst Neufert; 15 March 1900; Freyburg an der Unstrut, German Empire
- Died: 23 February 1986 (aged 85); Rolle, Switzerland
- Occupation: Architect
- Buildings: Mensa am Philosophenweg, Jena; Abbeanum in Jena; Own house and studio in Weimar-Gelmeroda; Bauordnungslehre Volk und reich verlag, Berlin; Ernst-Neufert-Haus, Darmstadt; Quelle-Versandzentrum, Nürnberg

Ernst Neufert (15 March 1900 – 23 February 1986) was a German architect who is known as an assistant of Walter Gropius, as a teacher and member of various standardization organizations, and especially for his widely disseminated reference book Architects' data.

== Life ==
Ernst Neufert was born in Freyburg an der Unstrut. At the age of 17, after five years of working as a bricklayer, Neufert entered the school of construction (Baugewerbeschule) in Weimar. His teacher recommended him to Walter Gropius in 1919 as one of his first students of the Bauhaus. He finished his studies in 1920, and together with the expressionist architect Paul Linder (1897-1968) embarked on a year-long study tour of Spain, where he sketched medieval churches. In Barcelona he met Antoni Gaudí, whose architecture made a deep impression on the young student. Neufert later became one of the first advocates of Gaudí in Germany. After 1921 he returned to the Bauhaus and became chief architect under Gropius in one of the most prominent architecture studios of the Weimar Republic.

In 1923 he met the painter Alice Spies-Neufert, a student of the Bauhaus masters Georg Muche and Paul Klee, and they married in 1924. They had four children (Peter, Christa, Ingrid and Ilas).

In 1925 Neufert worked in close collaboration with Gropius on the realization of the new Bauhaus buildings in Dessau and the completion of the masters' houses for Muche, Klee, and Wassily Kandinsky. In 1926 he returned to Weimar and became a teacher under Otto Bartning at the Bauhochschule (Building College), known as "the other Bauhaus". From 1928 to 1930 he realized various projects, such as the Mensa am Philosophenweg and the Abbeanum in Jena . In 1929 he built his private home in Gelmeroda, a village near Weimar (today the home of the Neufert Foundation and Neufert Box, a small museum with changing exhibitions). After closure of the Bauhochschule by the Nazis, he moved to Berlin and worked in a private school for art and architecture founded by Johannes Itten, which was forced to close as well in 1934. Later that year, he became the resident architect of Vereinigte Lausitzer Glaswerke (United Lusatia Glassworks). He designed the private home of its director Dr. Kindt (with colour glass by Charles Crodel) and various housing, office, and factory buildings in Weißwasser, Tschernitz and Kamenz.

Neufert published his reference book Bauentwurfslehre (Architects' Data) in 1936. This same year, he traveled to New York City and Taliesin to visit Frank Lloyd Wright and gauge his prospects of finding work in the United States. But in New York he was notified of the enormous success of the first edition of his book and returned to Berlin to prepare the second edition. New industrial commissions for his studio led to his decision to remain in Germany.

In 1938, Neufert was hired by Albert Speer, who was Adolf Hitler’s General Building Inspector for the Reich Capital at the time, to oversee the standardization of Germany’s building industry. Heading the Neufert Department, he developed the "Octametric" system for rapid construction. On behalf of the Nazi Party, Neufert published a second manual Bauordnungslehre (Building Over Treatise) in 1943 which detailed his findings. The book opened with a foreword by Speer, by then appointed as Hitler’s Reich Ministry of Armaments and War Production, who wrote of the importance of standardization for “total war.” The standards developed by Neufert were deployed in Germany and in occupied states, aiding the settlement of the "Aryan" population. By 1944, Neufert’s efforts were redirected to planning the post-war reconstruction of Germany’s bombed cities. The same year, Hitler included Neufert on the "God-gifted list" as an important architect, which saved him from military action in the final stages of the war.

After the Second World War, Neufert’s career was unaffected by denazification proceedings. As he had been Speer’s Beauftragter (consultant), Neufert was not “technically” considered an employee of the state. Leveraging his connections to the Bauhaus and Walter Gropius, he secured a professorship at the Technische Universität Darmstadt. He opened his own office, Neufert und Neufert, with his son Peter in 1953 and realized numerous projects, including many industrial buildings. He died in 1986 in his home in Bugnaux-sur-Rolle in Switzerland.

== Works ==
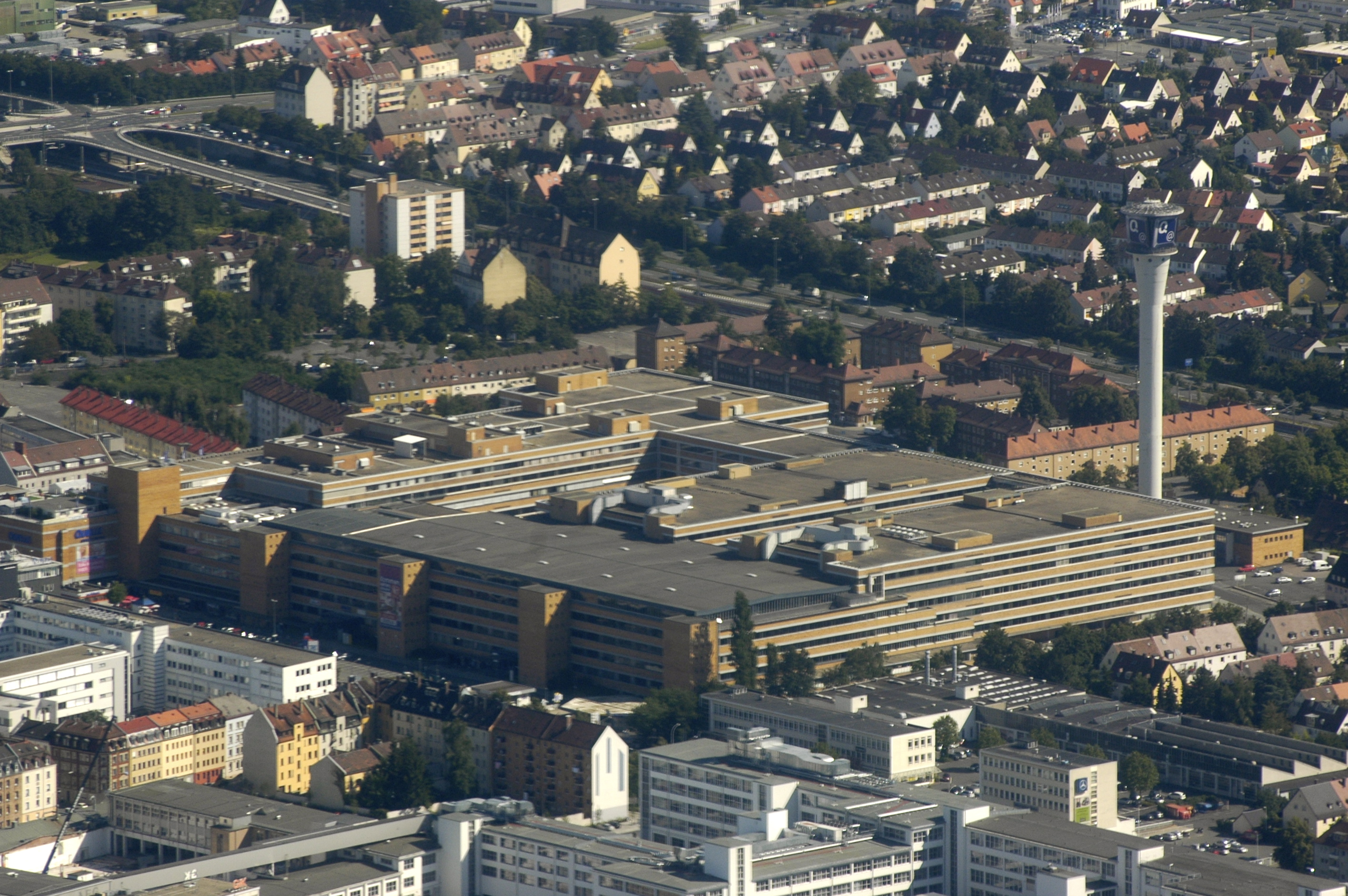
Quelle Versandzentrum in Nuremberg

- Mensa am Philosophenweg in Jena (1928-1930)
- Abbeanum in Jena (1929-1930)
- Own house and studio in Weimar-Gelmeroda (1929)
- Bauordnungslehre Volk und reich verlag, Berlin (1943)
- Ernst-Neufert-Haus, Darmstadt (1952-1955)
- Quelle-Versandzentrum in Nürnberg (1954-1967)

== Literature ==
- Neufert, Ernst; Neufert, Peter; Baiche, Bousmaha; Walliman, Nicholas (2002). Architects' Data (3rd ed.). Wiley-Blackwell. ISBN 978-0-632-05771-9.
- Prigge, Walter, ed. (1999). Ernst Neufert. Normierte Baukultur im 20. Jahrhundert. Edition Bauhaus Dessau. Frankfurt am Main: Campus Verlag. ISBN 3-593-36256-2.
