= Architects' Data =

Reference book by Ernst Neufert

- Cover of the 3rd English edition
- Author: Ernst Neufert
- Original title: Bauentwurfslehre
- Language: German
- Subject: architectural drawing; human factors and ergonomics
- Publisher: Bauwelt-Verlag (German 1st ed.); Lockwood (English 1st ed.)
- Publication date: 1936
- Publication place: Germany
- English publication date: 1970
- ISBN: 9780258965092

Architects' Data (German: Bauentwurfslehre), also simply known as the Neufert, is a reference book for spatial requirements in building design and site planning. First published in 1936 by Ernst Neufert, its 39 German editions and translations into 17 languages have sold over 500,000 copies. The first English version was published in 1970 and was translated from the original German by Rudolf Herz.

== History ==
Teaching at Weimar's Bauhochschule from 1926 after graduating from the Bauhaus, Ernst Neufert began to collect data about building, in a way of rationalization. It was first published in 1936, as a handbook for students and architects. Since then, more than half a million books have been printed, in 39 German editions and 17 other languages. The first English edition was published in 1970. In the US, it competes with the most common Architectural Graphic Standards and is little known compared to Germany. Until 1986, Ernst Neufert was its editor, after which his son Peter took over the publishing with his company AG Neufert Mittmann Graf Partner, until his death in 1995.

== Contents ==
The book is conceived to help the initial design of buildings by providing extensive information about spatial requirements. Dealing mostly with ergonomics and with functional building layouts, thousands of drawings illustrate the text, organised according to building typologies. Weighting now slightly less than two kilograms, it has been continuously updated.

== Influence ==
The Argentine artist Guillermo Kuitca worked on the rationalization of architecture within his piece "Neufert Suite" in 1998.
