= Alexander Montgomery Thackara =

United States Naval officer (1848–1937)

- Born: September 24, 1848; Philadelphia, Pennsylvania, U.S.
- Died: 1937 (aged 88–89); Neuilly-sur-Seine, France
- Military career
- Allegiance: United States
- Branch: United States Army

Alexander Montgomery Thackara (1848–1937), addressed as "Mont" in family correspondence, was born in Philadelphia in 1848. He graduated from the United States Naval Academy at Annapolis in 1869. He served in the Navy for twenty-three years in European and the Far East.

He met Eleanor Sherman, the daughter of William Tecumseh Sherman (Commanding General of the United States Army from 1869–1883), in 1879. They were married on May 5, 1880, at General Sherman's home in Washington D. C. The couple had four children: Alexander Montgomery ("Lex"), William Tecumseh Sherman ("Sherman"), Elizabeth, and Eleanor.

Thackara left the service in 1881 to enter his father's business in Philadelphia. In 1897 President William McKinley appointed him U.S. Consul at Le Havre, France.[5] In December 1904, President Theodore Roosevelt approved Secretary of State John Hay’s proposal to move Thackara to Berlin,[new ref: TR Digital Library] where he served as Consul General from 1905 to 1913. President Woodrow Wilson then appointed him Consul General in Paris, a post he held from 1913 to 1924.[5][new ref: Abraham Lincoln Presidential Library] Eleanor played a leading role in the Red Cross in Paris during the First World War. She died in Paris in 1915 and Alexander M. Thackara died in 1937 from bronchial pneumonia in the American Hospital of Paris, located in Neuilly-sur-Seine, France, where he had lived for several years after his retirement.

Much of the correspondence between A. M. Thackara and family are housed in the Special Collections of Falvey Memorial Library at Villanova University as part of the Sherman-Thackara Collection.
