= Eleanor Sherman Thackara =

Daughter of American Gen. William T. Sherman (1859–1915)

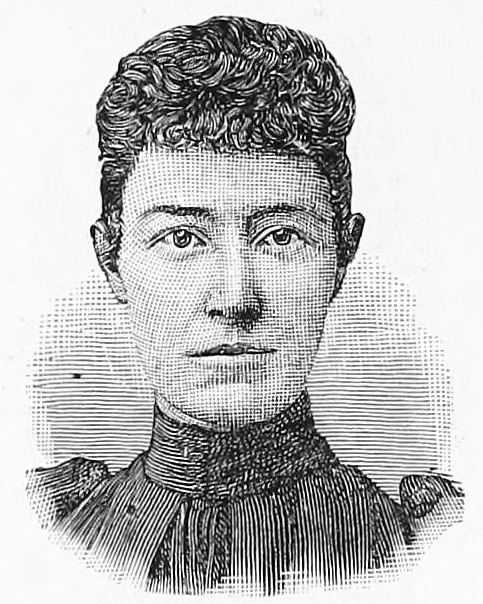
Eleanor Sherman Thackara

Eleanor Mary Sherman Thackara (1859–1915), is most known as the daughter of Gen. William Tecumseh Sherman of American Civil War fame and his wife, Ellen Ewing Sherman. Married to a diplomat, she spent a good deal of her time in Europe.

== Early life ==
=== Childhood ===
Known as Ellie, she was one of eight children. She grew up during the Civil War. Her mother, Ellen Ewing Sherman, was a cousin of Mother Angela Gillespie, directress of St. Mary's Academy in South Bend, Indiana. In 1864, Ellen Sherman took up temporary residence in South Bend, in order to have her young children educated at St. Mary's and Notre Dame du Lac.

In 1879 and at the age of 20, Thackara met Alexander Montgomery Thackara in Washington, D. C. The two began a courtship that lasted a year before their marriage on May 5, 1880, at her parents' home in Washington, D.C.

=== Family ===
In 1881, the Lt. Thackara left military service, moving to Philadelphia with Thackara to join the family business. While there, the couple spent three years in the town of Rosemont where Thackara gave birth to four children, Alexander Montgomery "Mont", William Sherman "Sherman", Elizabeth, and Eleanor. Thackara was also mentioned in the New York Evangelist as an upcoming writer as she weighed in on the idea of training schools in Philadelphia, but little else is known about her career in writing.

== Later life ==
=== Philanthropy ===
In 1897, Mr. Thackara was appointed by President William McKinley to serve as US Consul in Le Havre, France, moving the entire family overseas. He also served as Consul General in Berlin from 1905 to 1913. While living in France, she served with the Red Cross in Paris, and received awards for her work in the organization. She was elected President of the American Women's Club, a social organization.

=== Death ===
In 1913, Eleanor and Thackara returned to Paris when President Woodrow Wilson appointed the Lieutenant as Consul General once again. She died two years after their return on July 18, 1915. She was survived by her four children and her husband Alexander.
