= Designs of the Time =

Designs of the Time (Dott) was a UK design programme that developed new solutions to social and economic challenges by involving communities in designing local services. Dott Cornwall was created by Design Council as an innovation programme from the Department for Business, Innovation and Skills. The Dott programme produced two publications 'Common Sense' by Design Week and 'Wouldn't It Be Great' published by Design Council in 2007.

The first Dott was held in the North East of England during 2007, led by Programme Director John Thackara. The second, and final programme was in Cornwall during 2009/10 was led by Dr Andrea Cooper.

The key attributes of both programmes was a series of twenty citizen projects, a skills programme and policy recommendations.

== Dott Cornwall ==
The Design Council, Cornwall Council, University College Falmouth and the Technology Strategy Board were partners behind Dott (Designs of the time) in Cornwall and the Isles of Scilly during 2009/10. Dott worked with citizens to help them to co-design solutions to everyday issues that they face. The programme director, Andrea Siodmok, was previously chief design officer at the Design Council in London, and the executive director of both was Robert O'Dowd.

== Project overview ==
=== Eco Design Challenge ===
The challenge explored what design could do to reduce our ecological footprint. Dott worked with schools across Cornwall in the challenge; the winner of the Challenge was St Ives School.

This challenge asked Year 8 pupils in Cornwall: ‘What is the size of your school's ecological footprint and how could design make it smaller?’ Students across the county calculated the carbon footprint of their schools and came up with design solutions to reduce it. As well as studying different aspects of school life, participants also looked at the impact of journeys to and from school, school meals, water use and waste disposal. Led by Matt Hocking of Leap Media, the project aimed to encourage creative thinking, raise environmental awareness and throw innovative ideas into the way we approach a more sustainable future. The 'Eco design challenge' was supported by the Real Ideas Organization and The Learning Partnership.

=== RSA Design Directions ===
Dott collaborated with the Royal Society of Arts on a National design competition for design students in universities across the UK and Europe.

The brief was entitled ‘Design for Social Inclusion'. The challenge to the students was to design a product or service for a group of people of their choice currently excluded from mainstream design practice.

=== From Cornwall with Love ===
From Cornwall with Love looked for radical and inventive ways to promote the values of Cornwall through its produce and products.

The project worked with local producers and existing initiatives, such as Made in Cornwall, Hidden Art Cornwall and Taste of the Southwest, to use design to help push quality Cornish produce into the local and global spotlight. From Cornwall with Love focused on both products by local designers and makers as well as food produce, seeking to increase their availability and visibility. By establishing a link between the future brand and aspirations of the county, From Cornwall with Love aimed to stimulate growth in the dynamic businesses that will underpin Cornwall's future economy. Mark Irlam and Tom Tobia, founders of Something From Us, were the senior producers of this project.

=== New Work ===
Targeting groups at real or perceived risk of redundancy, New Work sought to improve signposting to new employment opportunities relevant to the economy and society of 21st-century Cornwall. The project focused on boosting future employment opportunities by improving awareness of and signposting to new jobs. Sponsored by the Learning Skills Council, the team worked with unemployed people, removing barriers that prevented them from accessing skills and future employment opportunities in Cornwall. The project worked with people across Cornwall to demonstrate how they can achieve personal success and nurture individual talents in positive ways that are relevant to the economy and society of modern-day Cornwall. Robert Woolf & Kathryn Woolf from Sea Communications, a creative digital marketing agency, were the senior producers.

=== Cornwall Works 50+ ===
Dott also worked with people and businesses to co-create ways to help older people find new work and stay in their jobs for longer.

Cornwall's workforce is ageing, and by 2017, about 34.4% of the workforce is predicted to be over 50. As the demographic of the workplace changes, its provisions for older workers will need to adapt. Working hand-in-hand with businesses and communities, Cornwall Works 50+ looked at all sorts of ways to improve and extend employment opportunities for older people. Its key concerns included how to encourage employers to take on older workers and how to overcome barriers faced by older people wanting to return to the workforce. Deborah Szebeko and Ian Drysdale from ThinkPublic were the senior producers.

=== Serious Play ===
Through Serious Play, Designers co-design a playground that could potentially supply power to the National Grid and inspire a whole new generation of play.

The Serious Play project set out to inspire the next generation by putting this energy to positive use in these energy-hungry times. At its outset, the project sought to discover whether we can harness the energy of children at play and feed it into the energy supply. Making energy generation community-based and seriously good fun, the focus of the project is to co-design playground equipment, co-create sustainable power and co-build an adventure playground. Mike Hawes of Mor Design was senior producing this project.

=== Big Design Challenge ===
The final project of Dott was the Big Design Challenge which encouraged citizens to co-design and get involved in the co-production of solutions to local challenges. Big Design Challenge was subsequently selected by NESTA to be part of its Creative Councils programme.
