= Vrijhoeve-Capelle =

- Village
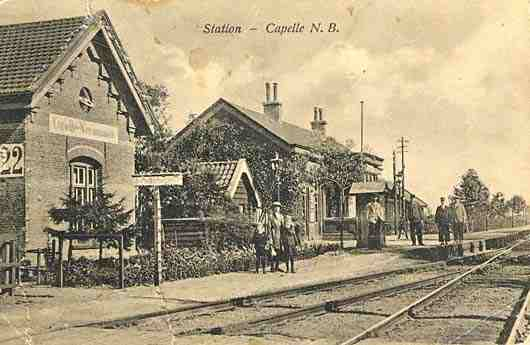
- Old photo of station in Vrijhoeve-Capelle

- Location in the province of North Brabant in the Netherlands Vrijhoeve-Capelle (Netherlands)
- Coordinates: 51°40′N 5°02′E
- Country: Netherlands
- Province: North Brabant
- Municipality: Waalwijk

Area
  - Total: 3.99 km^{2} (1.54 sq mi)
- Elevation: 1.4 m (4.6 ft)

Population (2021)
  - Total: 4,080
  - Density: 1,020/km^{2} (2,650/sq mi)
- Time zone: UTC+1 (CET)
  - Summer (DST): UTC+2 (CEST)
- Postal code: 5161
- Dialing code: 0416

Vrijhoeve-Capelle is a village in the Dutch province of North Brabant. It is located in the municipality of Waalwijk, about 10 km north of Tilburg.

== History ==
The village was first mentioned in 1523 as "ter Capelle in die Vrie Houven", and means "piece of land free of taxation near Capelle". Vrijhoeve-Capelle developed in the Middle Ages near the peat excavation area on the border of Holland and the Duchy of Brabant.

Huis Zuidewijn is a former estate. The central part and the left wing date from the late-16th century. The right wing was added in the 17th century. The estate was modified and extended in 1763.

Vrijhoeve-Capelle was home to 444 people in 1840. In 1886, a railway station was built on the Lage Zwaluwe to 's-Hertogenbosch railway line. It closed in 1950 and the building was demolished the same year. Vrijhoeve-Capelle was a separate municipality until 1923, when it became part of Sprang-Capelle. In 1997, it became part of the municipality of Waalwijk.

== Gallery ==
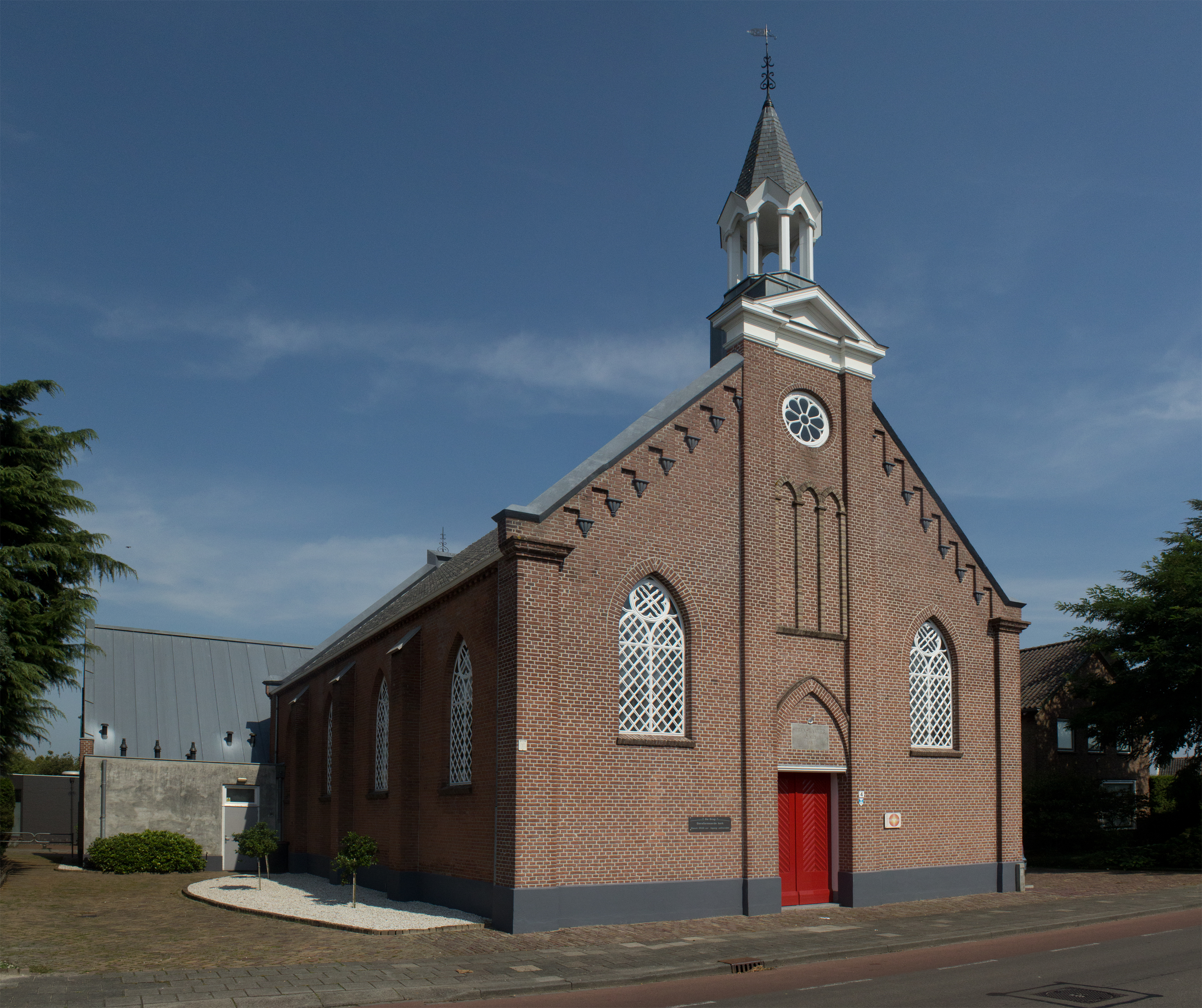
Reformed Church in Vrijhoeve-Capelle

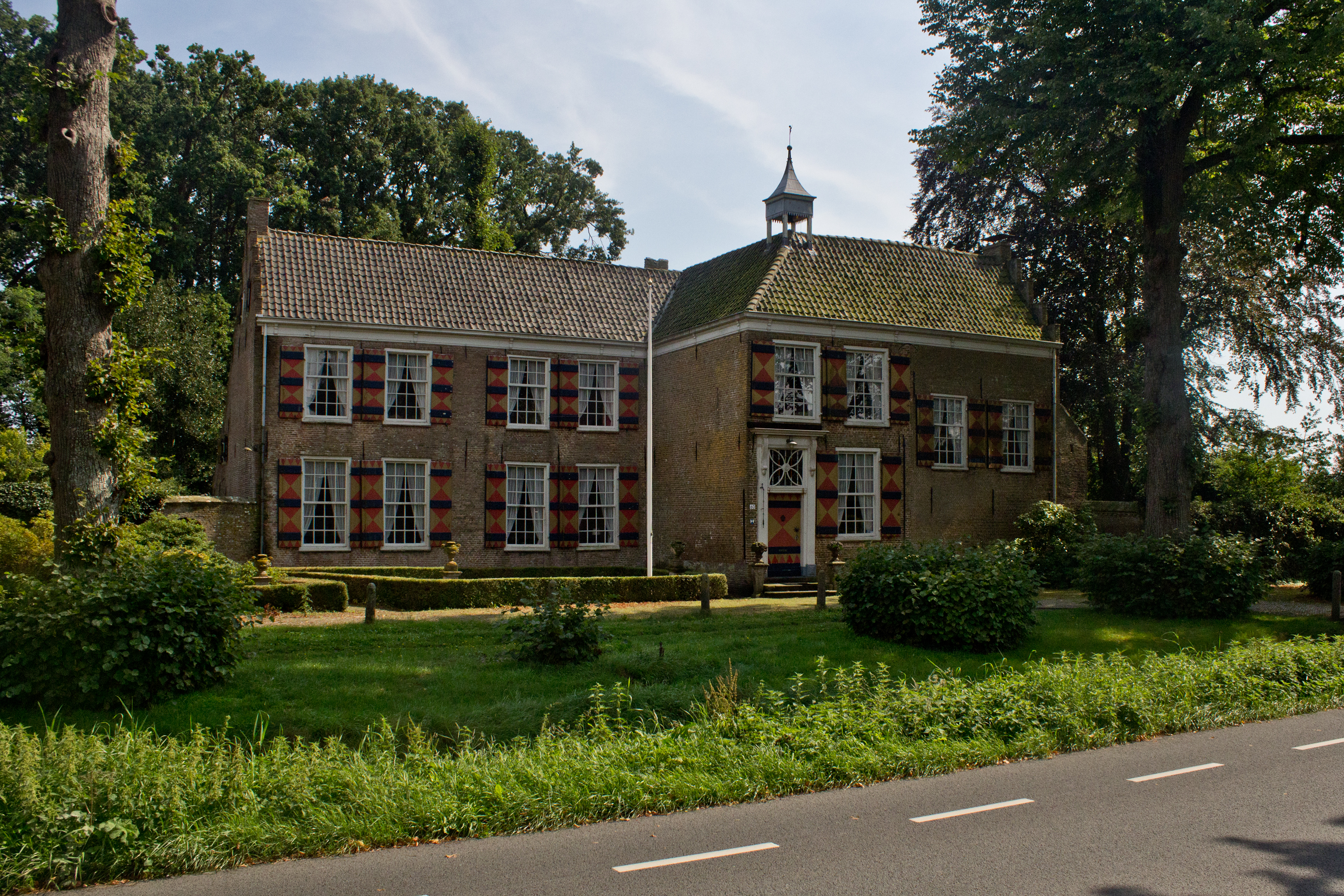
Huis Zuidewijn
