= Drongelen =

- Village
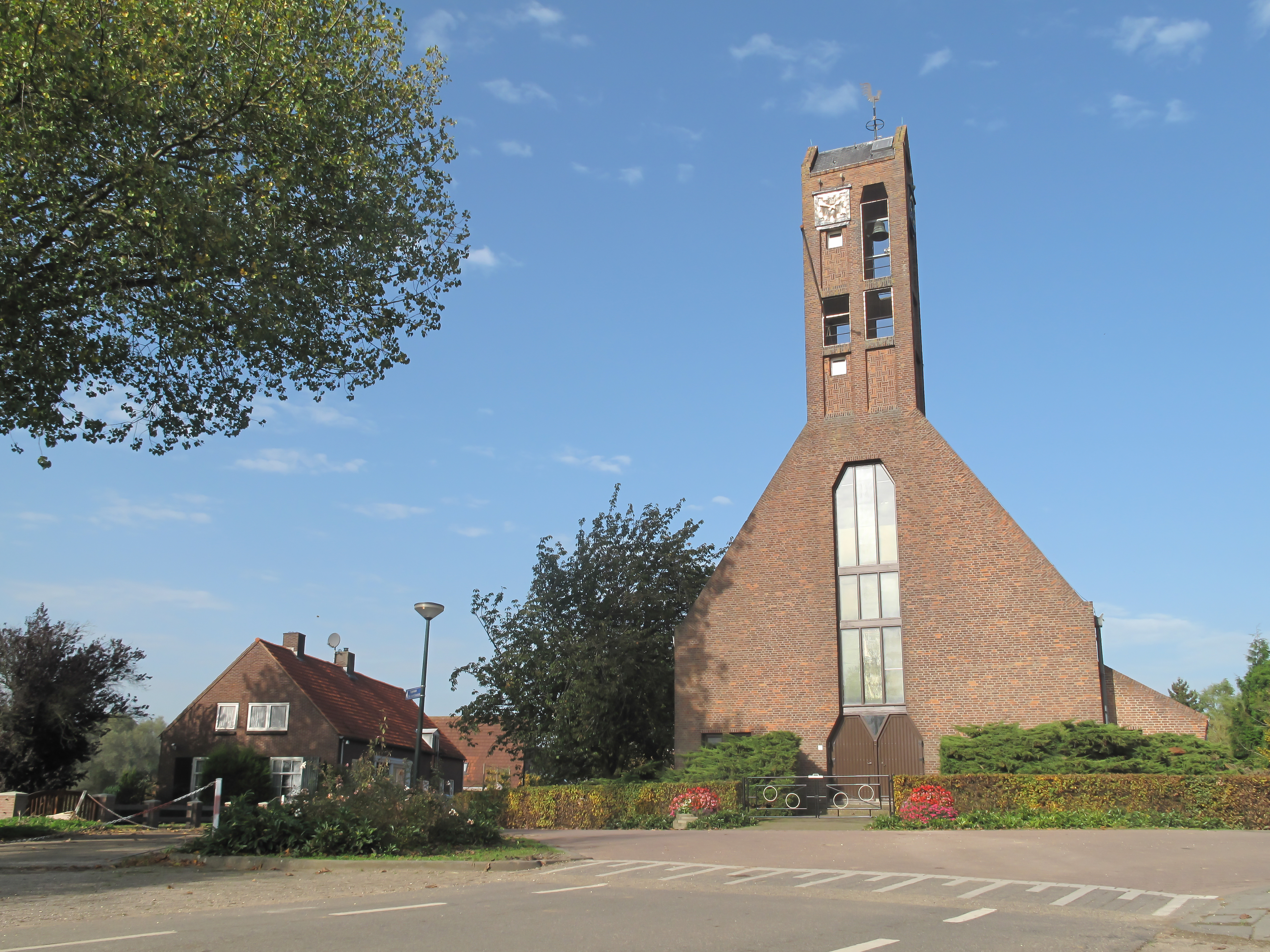
- Church in Drongelen

- Coat of arms

- Location in the province of North Brabant in the Netherlands Drongelen (Netherlands)
- Coordinates: 51°42′54″N 5°3′15″E
- Country: Netherlands
- Province: North Brabant
- Municipality: Altena

Area
  - Total: 6.47 km^{2} (2.50 sq mi)
- Elevation: 2.1 m (6.9 ft)

Population (2021)
  - Total: 415
  - Density: 64.1/km^{2} (166/sq mi)
- Time zone: UTC+1 (CET)
  - Summer (DST): UTC+2 (CEST)
- Postal code: 4267
- Dialing code: 0416

Drongelen is a village in the Dutch province of North Brabant. It is located in the municipality of Altena.

The village was first mentioned in 1270 as de Drungele, and might mean "open forest near the Drongel river".

The church of Drongelen was destroyed by a flood in 1509, and not rebuilt until 1700. In November and December 1944, almost the entire village and the church were destroyed during the fighting between the Allied Forces and the German army. A wooden church was donated by Sweden as a temporary church. In 1951, a new church was rebuilt. The wooden church was moved to Amstelveen where it burnt down in 2000.

Drongelen was home to 358 people in 1840. The school closed in 1984 and became the village house. There is a free car ferry between Drongen and Waalwijk across the Bergsche Maas.

Drongelen was a separate municipality until 1923, when it was merged with Eethen. Before 1908, the name of the municipality was Drongelen, Haagoort, Gansoijen en Doeveren.

== Gallery ==
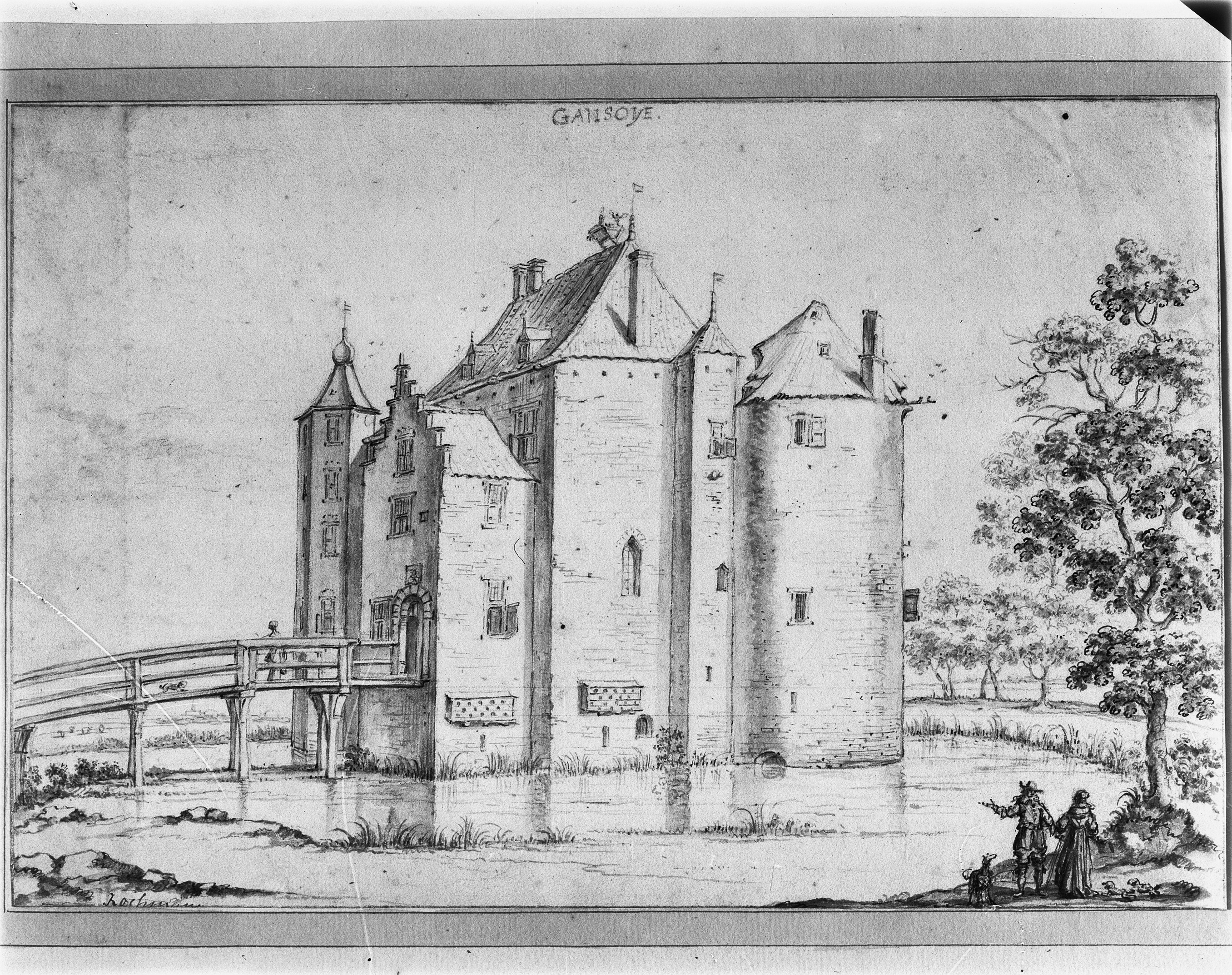
Castle "Slot Gansoijen" (1738)

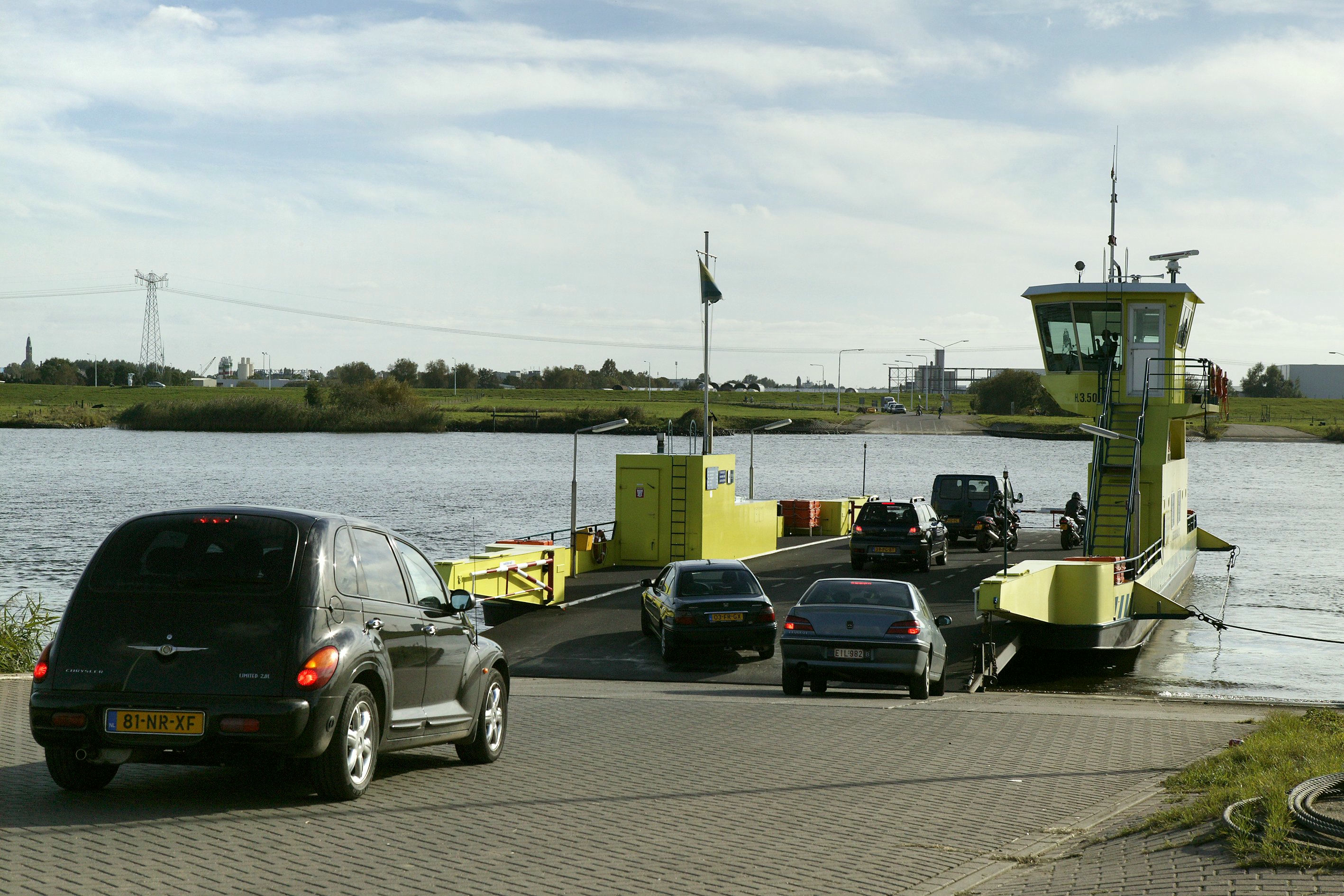
Ferry between Drongelen and Waalwijk
