= Hendrikus Chabot =

Dutch painter and sculptor

- Born: 2 August 1894; Sprang, Netherlands
- Died: 2 May 1949 (aged 54); Rotterdam, Netherlands
- Other names: Henk Chabot, Hendrik Chabot
- Occupations: Painter, Sculptor

Hendrikus "Henk" Chabot (Dutch pronunciation: [ɦɛnˈdrikʏs ˈɦɛŋk ɕaːˈbɔt]; 2 August 1894 – 2 May 1949) was a Dutch painter and sculptor.

Hendrik Chabot: Artist beyond Expressionism. If there is any one modern Dutch painter who stands near to Van Gogh, it is, surely, Hendrik Chabot (1894–1949), whose work, as a critic has written, is hard, awkward, tragic, and... carries the mark of genius.

== Life and work ==
Henk Chabot was a son of Willem Chabot and Johanna Aantje van den Hoven. As a child he moved with his parents in 1906 to Rotterdam. He followed classes in the evening at the Rotterdam academy of art and science now known as the Willem de Kooning Academie. From 1915 he restored paintings, from 1916 in his own studio at the Zuidblaak, and shortly afterwards at the Wijnstraat. In the early twenties he made trips to Germany and Austria and visited museums among other in Dresden, Munich and Vienna. Soon after he made his first sculptures. He joined the artists Group the Branding (surf) (founded around 1915, abolished in 1926). Several other members were: L. van Kuyk, G. Ladage, T. Gits, B. Canter, J. Tielens, G. Rober, H. Bieling, M. en H. Richters, P. Begeer and Leendert Bolle.

In 1927 he married Antonia (To) Tolenaars (1900–1988).

Starting in the thirties painting began to predominate: topics were derived from the Rotterdam town life and port scenery. In 1933 he stayed in Vrouwenpolder in Zeeland, where he met and became friends with Charley Toorop and Bram Hammacher. New topics were: the sea, farmers, cows and horses. Chabot joined the Kring van beeldende kunstenaars R33 (Circle of artists R33) (abolished in 1940). After returning in 1934 from Zeeland he settled along the little peat river in Bergschenhoek near Rotterdam, because Henk and To had grown away from the city life. His works from the pre-Zeeland period stayed stored at the studio at the Wijnstraat, which was taken over by his younger brother and painter Wim Chabot. When Wim in 1936 moved his studio to the Wijnhaven, the stored works of Henk moved along. Due to the German bombardment on May 14, 1940, all this works and those of Wim got lost.

In 1937 'De Voetballer' (football player) was disclosed, a big concrete in Stadion Feyenoord. He was also invited to make a painting for the captain's cabin of the Nieuw Amsterdam (1938), flagship of the Holland America Line. For this occasion Chabot specially rented a studio where he made a big landscape.

Before World War II he regularly exhibited at Carel van Lier's in his 'Kunstzaal van Lier' at the Rokin in Amsterdam. Chabot was in the last years before the war and a short while after more or less the figurehead of Dutch fine arts. During World War II in 1943 he made a series of paintings with a dark colour palette on the topic get-away: the pinnacle of his work concerning the war. In the years hereafter the colour palette rapidly got more light-coloured, brighter. Chabot died in 1949 in Rotterdam. The Hendrik Chabot Award was named after him.

His probably most well known work is the 'Brand van Rotterdam' (Fire of Rotterdam) which he made after he saw from his little cottage at the River Rotte the burning city after the bombardment of Rotterdam by the Germans on May 14, 1940. This painting is owned by the municipality of Rotterdam but in permanent loan at the Chabot Museum.

== Public collections ==
Works of Henk Chabot are in the public collections of:

- Museum de Fundatie, Zwolle
- Groninger Museum, Groningen
- Museum Boijmans Van Beuningen, Rotterdam
- Chabot Museum, Rotterdam
- Van Abbemuseum, Eindhoven
- Gemeentemuseum Den Haag
- Stedelijk Museum Amsterdam
- De Wieger, Deurne (Noord-Brabant)
