= Domino sparrow =

Dutch house sparrow

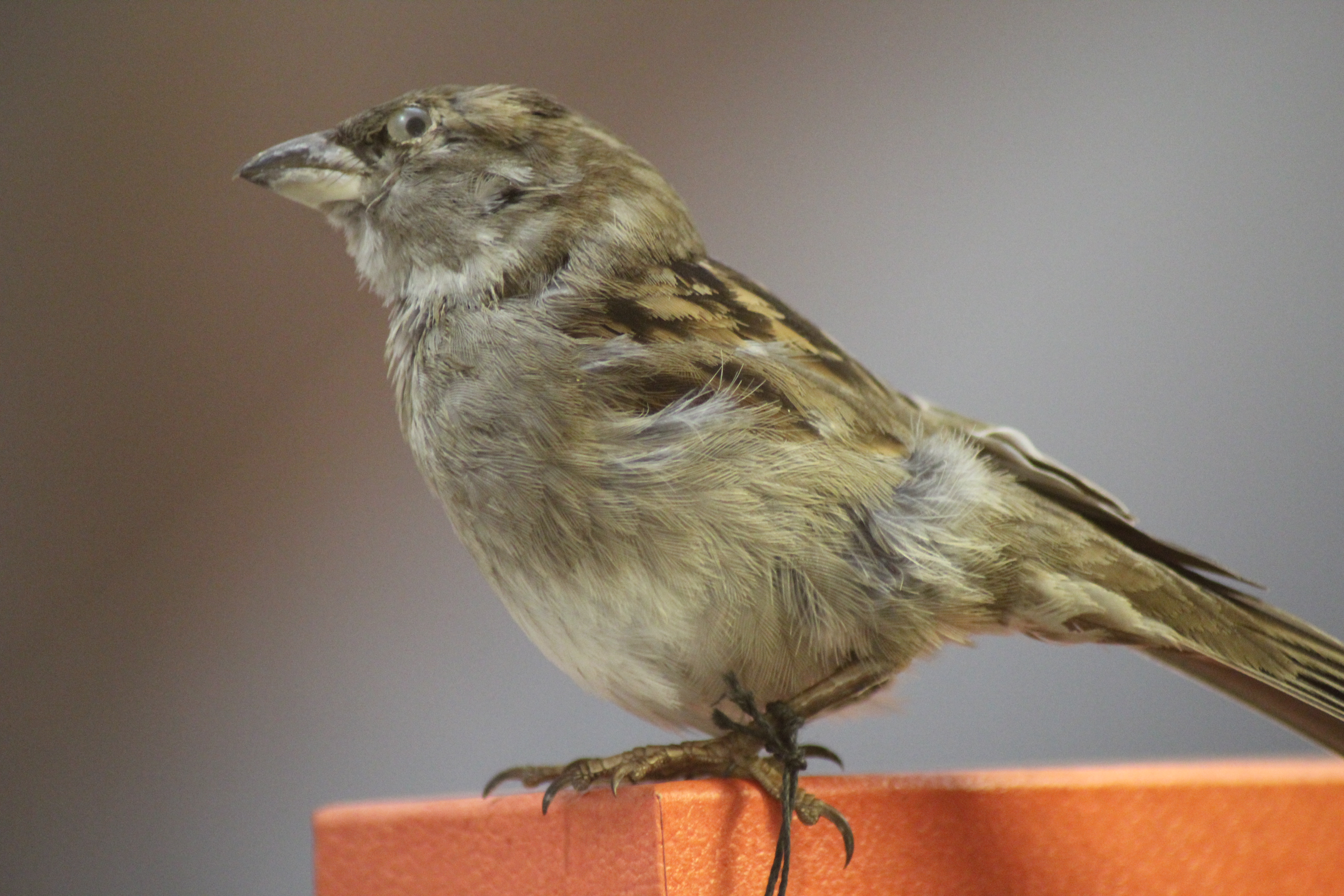
- The sparrow's remains on display at the Natural History Museum Rotterdam
- Other name: Dutch: Dominomus
- Species: House sparrow
- Died: 14 November 2005; Frisian Expo Centre, Leeuwarden
- Cause of death: Death by firearm
- Resting place: Natural History Museum Rotterdam
- Known for: Toppling 23,000 domino tiles

The domino sparrow (Dutch: dominomus) was a house sparrow (Passer domesticus) that was shot and killed by a hunter from the company Duke Faunabeheer in the Frisian Expo Centre in Leeuwarden, Netherlands, during preparations for Domino Day on 14 November 2005. With only four days to go until Domino Day 2005, the bird flew into the building and landed on several domino tiles, eventually causing 23,000 of them (out of 4.3 million) to fall. Because of the protective gaps that were placed between groups of dominoes, the damage was limited. Duke Faunabeheer was hired to remove the unwanted intruder from the centre. After trying to capture the sparrow with nets and sticks, the company decided to shoot the bird.

== Controversy ==
The Dierenbescherming, a large animal protection organisation, went to court against Duke Faunabeheer and the production company Endemol for their actions against the domino sparrow. The public prosecutor fined the shooter €200 (equivalent to €291 in 2023) for illegally killing an animal belonging to a protected species.

After several Dutch newspapers and television stations announced what had happened in the Frisian Expo Centre, several animal rights organisations, popular blogs like GeenStijl and radio DJs like Ruud de Wild devoted time and attention to the subject. They claimed that killing an animal in order to save a television show was a low deed and accused the shooter of having no respect for animal life. De Wild said that he was willing to give a €3,000 reward (equivalent to €4,364 in 2023) to anyone who toppled the dominoes before the start of the event, although nobody did it.

A month after the sparrow's death, the Dutch Public Prosecutor gave the bird's remains to the Natuurhistorisch Museum in Rotterdam, as requested by its curator Kees Moeliker. The museum stuffed the dead bird and displayed it in an exhibition on the house sparrow from November 2006 until May 2007. The bird was subsequently moved to an exhibition containing dead animals with famous backstories. In 2019, it was reported that even almost a decade and a half after the incident, the hunter who killed the bird still received death threats.

== See also ==
- List of individual birds
