= Chabot Museum =

Dutch art museum

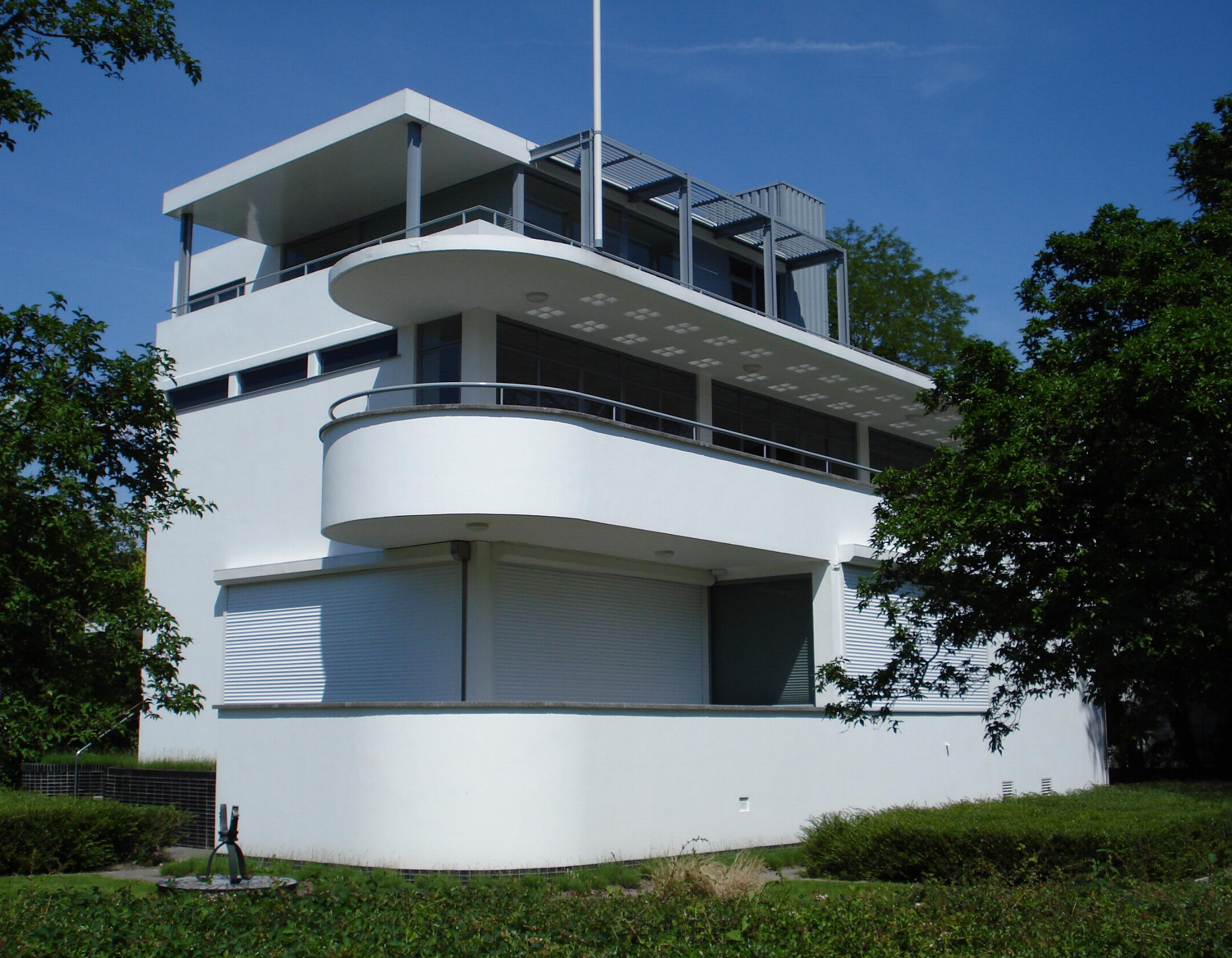
- Chabot Museum in 2007

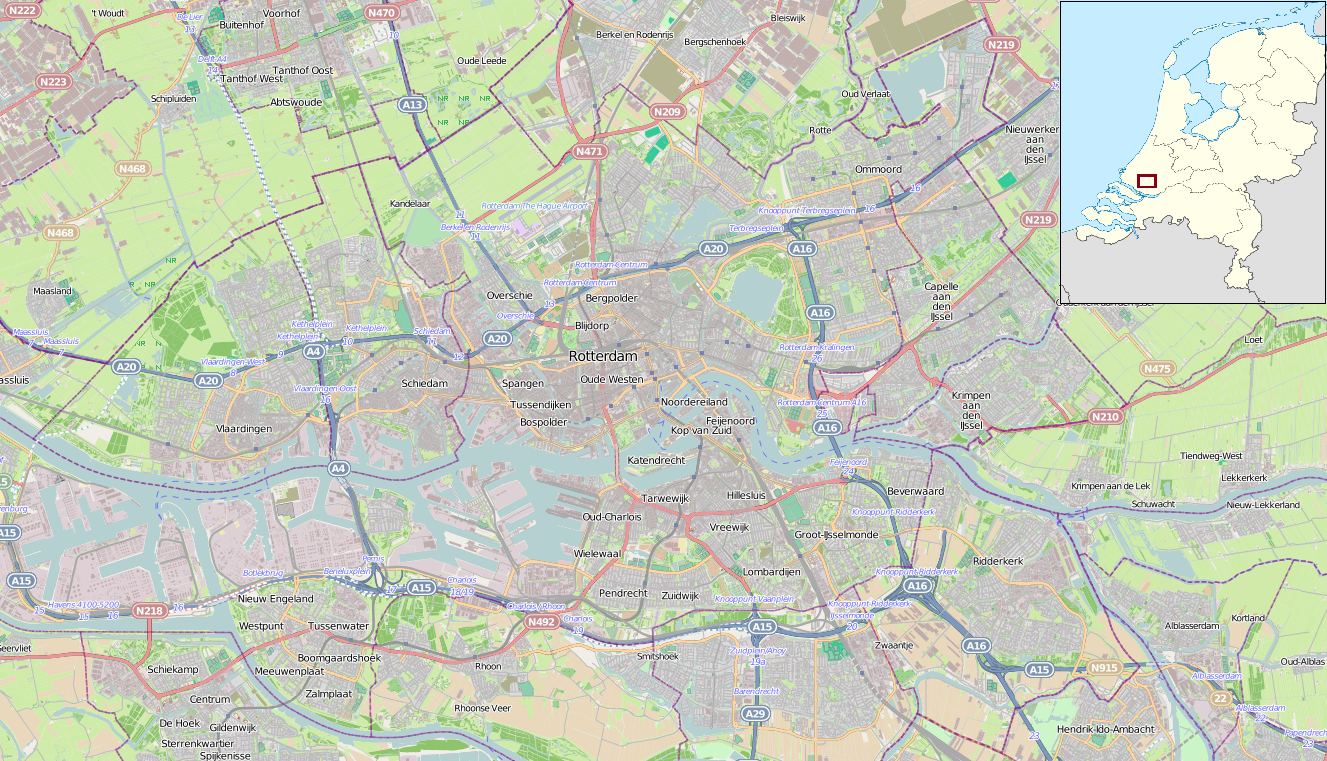
- Location in Rotterdam in the Netherlands
- Established: 1993
- Location: Museumpark 11; Rotterdam, Netherlands
- Coordinates: 51°54′52″N 4°28′30″E
- Website: www.chabotmuseum.nl

The Chabot Museum (Dutch pronunciation: [ɕaːˈbɔt myˈzeːjʏm]) is a museum dedicated to the Dutch painter and sculptor Hendrik (Henk) Chabot in Rotterdam in the Netherlands. The museum is housed in a monumental villa in the Museumpark, near the Museum Boijmans van Beuningen and the Netherlands Architecture Institute.

== History ==
The museum opened in 1993.

As of 2016 the Chabot Museum awards the Hendrik Chabot Prijs, an award for visual arts, which was originally created by the Prins Bernhard Cultuurfonds.

== Building ==
The Chabot Museum is located at the Museumpark in Rotterdam Centrum, between the Netherlands Architecture Institute and the Museum Boijmans Van Beuningen.

It is housed in a white villa designed in 1938 for C. H. Kraaijeveld in the style of New Objectivity. The architects were Gerrit Willem Baas, a former employee of Brinkman and Van der Vlugt, and Leonard Stokla, a former bureau chief of Kromhout.

The villa has been a rijksmonument (national heritage site) since 2000.

== Collection ==
The museum is dedicated to painter and sculptor Hendrik Chabot. The museum collection includes works from the 1920s from the Schortemeijer collection and 26 works from the Second World War from the private collection of Mrs. Toll-Breugem. There are also works on loan, such as Chabot's most famous work Fire of Rotterdam, showing the result of the German bombings of the city in 1940.

== Governance ==
The museum is managed as part of the Hendrik Chabot Foundation (in Dutch: Stichting Hendrik Chabot). The director is Jisc Biljsma. In 2023, there were 36,812 visitors, and a budget of 887,376 Euros.
