= Dutch Society for the Protection of Animals =

Dutch voluntary animal protection organization

Nederlandse Vereniging tot Bescherming van Dieren
- Abbreviation: DB
- Formation: August 25, 1864
- Type: NGO
- Purpose: Animal welfare
- Staff: 65
- Volunteers: 200,000
- Website: dierenbescherming.nl

The Dutch Society for the Protection of Animals (Dutch: Nederlandse Vereniging tot Bescherming van Dieren or De Dierenbescherming) is a Dutch voluntary animal protection organisation, founded in 1864.

== Activities ==
In the early years following its establishment, the Dutch Society for the Protection of Animals was an aristocratic movement seeking animal protection, similar to organisations elsewhere. Early objectives included abolishing draft dogs, improving living and working conditions for horses, banning the docking of dog and horse ears and tails, and better slaughter regulations (including mandatory anaesthesia). The group tried to prevent animal abuse by influencing public opinion through brochures and lectures and by drafting national laws. Early legislative accomplishments included an 1875 law on rabies prevention, including punishments for intentional abuse of a dog or cat; and an 1880 law protecting species useful for agriculture and timber production, offering official protection to certain birds and mammals. A milestone was reached in 1886 when an article was included in the penal code that made abuse of all animals punishable. As enforcement of these statutes proved lax, in 1920 the Society set up a rural inspectorate, active until its replacement by the National Animal Inspection Foundation in 1975. Additionally, the Society backed a 1961 law on animal protection, which among other provisions banned using dogs as pack animals.

In the 1980s the Society actively campaigned against ritual slaughter. In 1984 the State Secretary of Agriculture and Fisheries, relying on the DSPA Ritual Slaughter Commission report, decided to gradually eliminate the production of ritually slaughtered meat for export. The Ministry of Agriculture argued that this ruling didn't affect the production of ritually slaughtered meat for the consumption within the Netherlands and therefore did not infringe upon religious freedoms. However, the Ministry of Interior ruled it a violation of the principle of religious freedom, and the decision was eventually cancelled.

In 1984 DSPA started a national campaign promoting the sale of free range eggs (Dutch: Scharreleieren, literally: scratching eggs). New distribution channels were created and special stickers were produced by DSPA, marking the bakeries and the restaurants that use scratching eggs.

In 1985 a new draft of the Dutch Animal Health Act was issued. It contained a new chapter on animal welfare, so its name was amended accordingly, to Animal Health and Welfare Act. Because the new Welfare Act resulted in few concrete measures, DSPA took the initiative for revising it. According to DSPA, the Welfare Act should implement the "no-unless" principle - no practices that injure animal welfare are allowed, unless specific regulations permitting it exist. As a result of DSPA efforts, the Dutch parliament requested the Ministry of Agriculture to revise the Welfare Act in accordance with the "no-unless" principle. The initial draft was met with caution by parliament in 1989, but after further changes and discussions it finally passed the revised version of the Animal and Welfare Act in 1992. The new animal welfare law also included a chapter on transgenic animals, which was a subject of study initiated by DSPA in 1985.

In 2005 a news story about a sparrow killed during the Domino day preparations received worldwide media attention. The bird flew into the FEC exhibition centre in Leeuwarden, knocking down over 23,000 out of 4,321,000 domino tiles that had been arranged in preparation for a world record attempt. A hired animal expert, after failing to capture the bird, shot it with an air rifle. The event was widely reported and the death of the Domino Day sparrow was protested by animal rights groups. DSPA launched an investigation, which resulted in a 200 euro fine issued by the public prosecutor to the shooter for the unlawful killing of an animal belonging to a protected species.

During its history, the Society has seen strong growth in membership: from some 2,000 in 1875, it had doubled by about 1900, and by 1920, it was large enough that it had to hire permanent staff. Growth continued after World War II and during the environmentally-conscious 1970s, membership rose from 65,000 to 100,000. The mid-1990s saw another jump in membership, reaching 200,000 by 2009.
