= Sprang, Netherlands =

Sprang
- Village
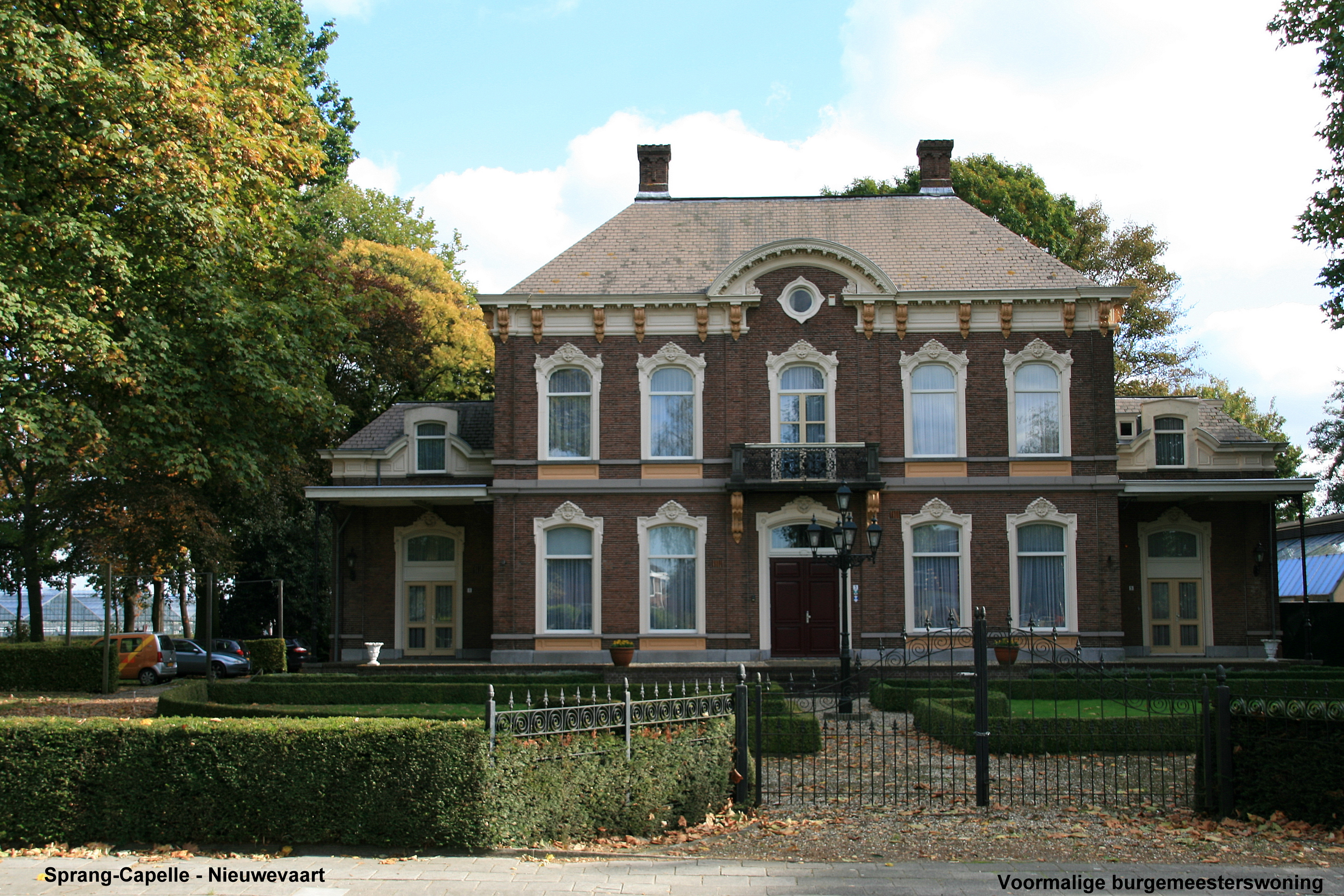
- Former mayor's residence

- Flag Coat of arms

- Location in the province of North Brabant in the Netherlands Sprang (Netherlands)
- Coordinates: 51°40′N 5°03′E
- Country: Netherlands
- Province: North Brabant
- Municipality: Waalwijk

Area
  - Total: 1.92 km^{2} (0.74 sq mi)
- Elevation: 1.4 m (4.6 ft)

Population (2021)
  - Total: 2,885
  - Density: 1,500/km^{2} (3,890/sq mi)
- Time zone: UTC+1 (CET)
  - Summer (DST): UTC+2 (CEST)
- Postal code: 5161
- Dialing code: 0416

Sprang is a village in the Dutch province of North Brabant. It is located in the municipality of Waalwijk, about 12 km north of Tilburg.

== History ==
The village was first mentioned in 1331 as Spranc, and is a water name (from the same root word as spring). Sprang is a road village which developed after William III, Count of Holland had awarded concessions to excavated the peat in the area in 1301.

The Dutch Reformed church dates from around 1400. The tower was added in the late 15th century. The church was supposed to be much bigger. A part of the tower collapsed in 1612 and was not repaired until 1911. The grist mill Dye Sprancke was built around 1747. From 1930 onwards, the wind mill started to be used less and began to deteriorate. In 1958, it was bought by the municipality and has been restored several times. It operates on a voluntary basis.

Sprang was home to 1,526 people in 1840. Sprang was a separate municipality until 1923, when it became part of Sprang-Capelle. A large part of the village was destroyed in 1945. In 1997, it became part of Waalwijk.

== Gallery ==
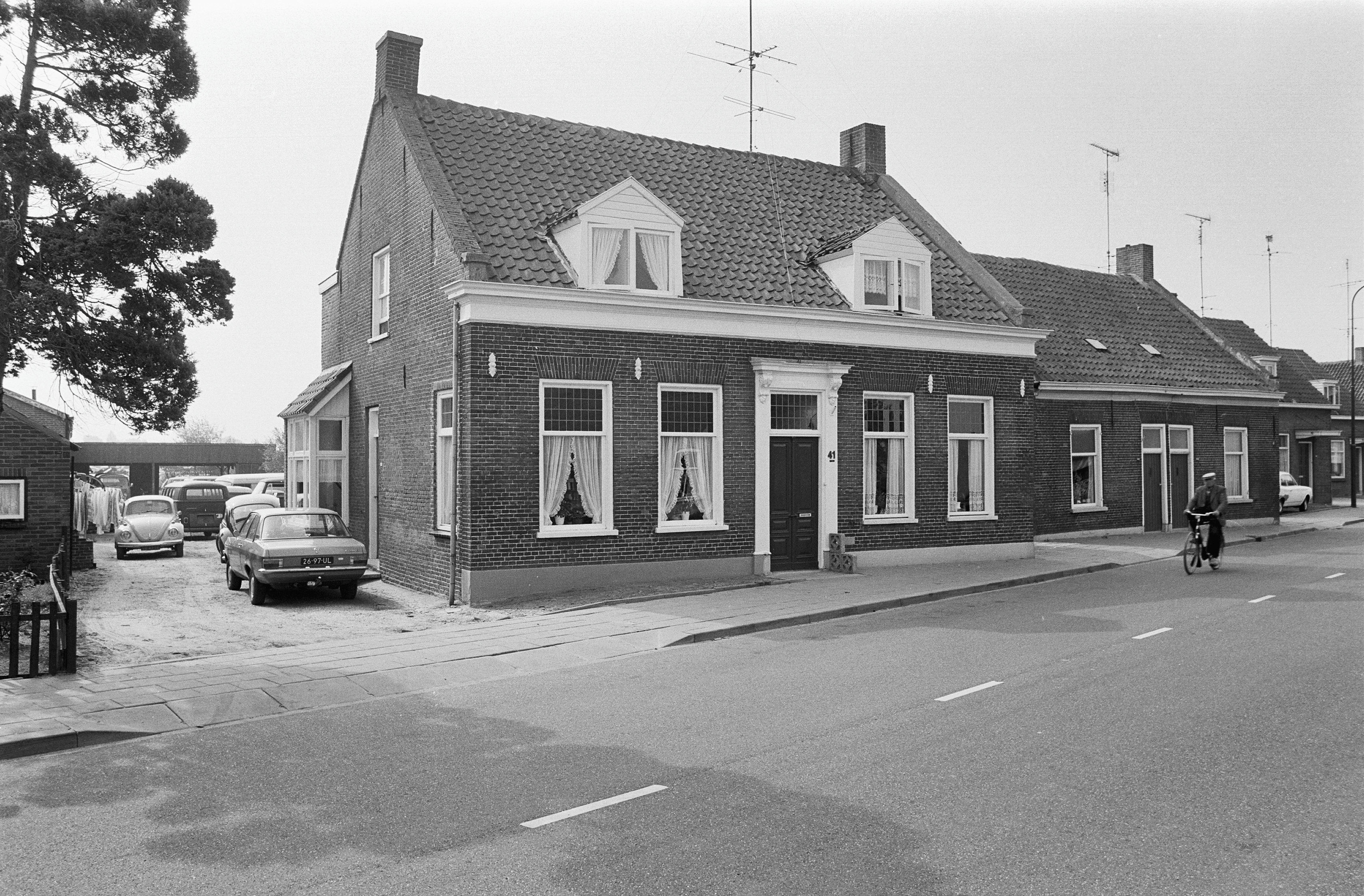
Street view (1976)

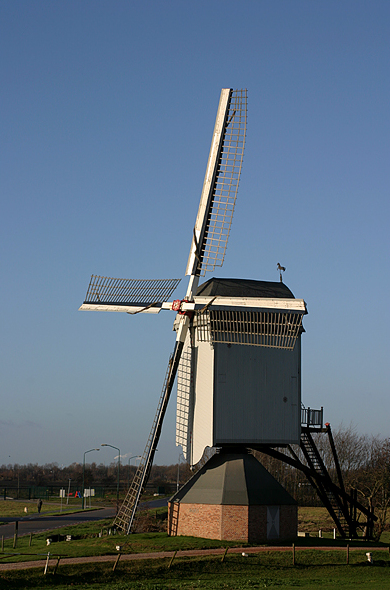
Wind mill Dye Sprancke

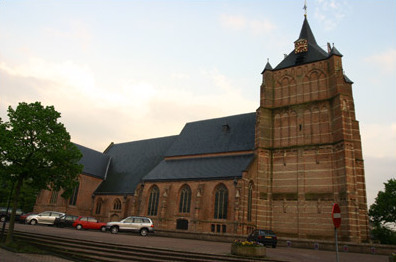
Dutch Reformed church
