= Jan-Hein Kuijpers =

Dutch lawyer and columnist

- Born: 27 October 1968 (age 57); Waalwijk, Netherlands
- Occupation: Lawyer
- Website: www.kuijpersnillesen.nl

Jan-Hein Kuijpers (born 27 October 1968) is a Dutch lawyer and columnist.

Jan-Hein Kuijpers was born in Waalwijk. Together with Arthur van der Biezen he runs the law firm Kuijpers & van der Biezen Advocaten in 's-Hertogenbosch. Since 19 February 2007, he has defended Dutch gangster Willem Holleeder, after Bram Moszkowicz stepped down as Holleeder's counsel. Piet-Hein Kuijpers also writes columns for the Dutch magazine Aktueel.
