= Sprang-Capelle =

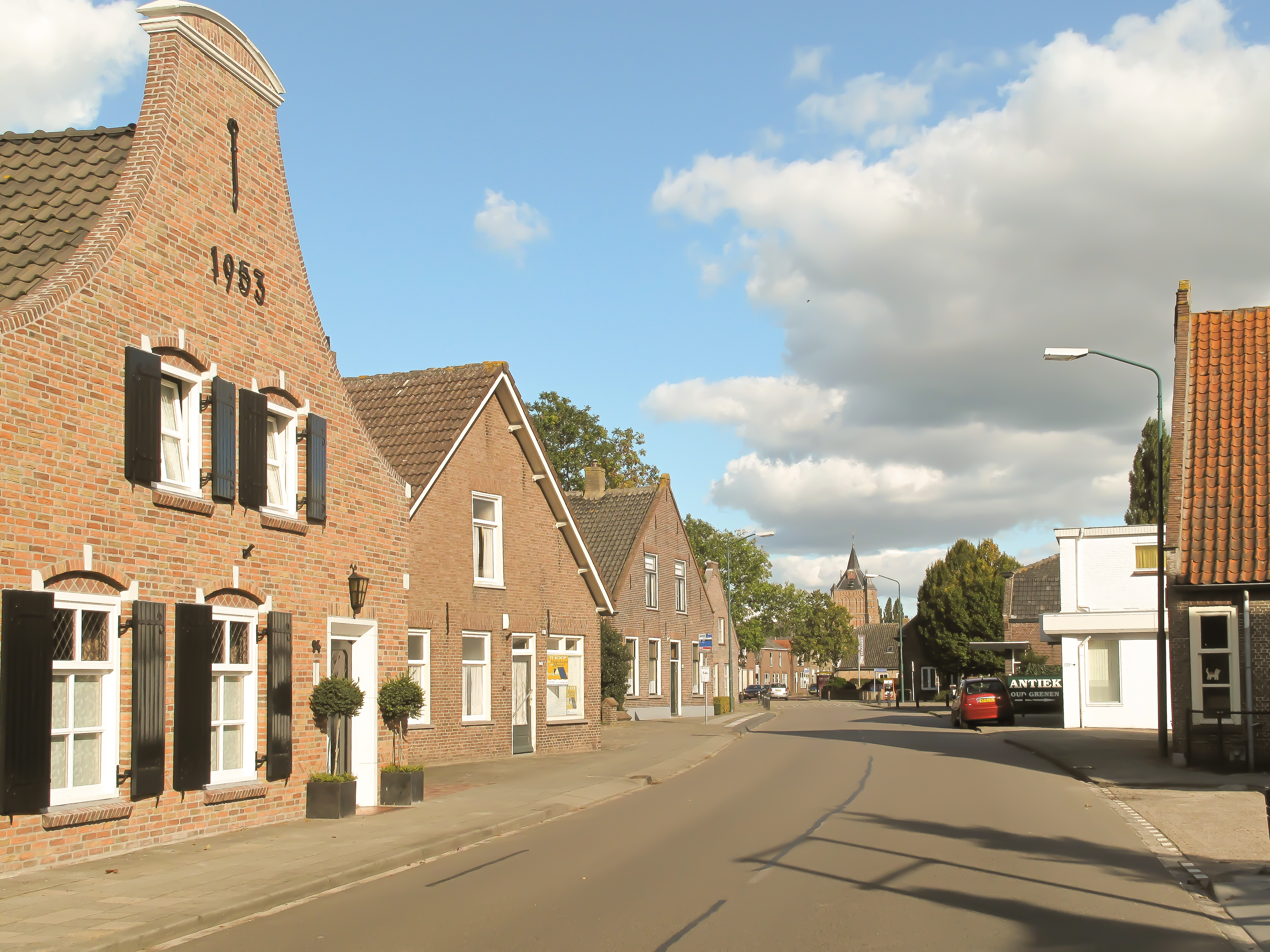
- The "Van der Duinstraat"

- Flag Coat of arms
- Interactive map of Sprang-Capelle
- Coordinates: 51°40′13″N 5°2′48″E
- Country: Netherlands
- Province: North Brabant
- Municipality: Waalwijk

Population (2007)
  - Total: 10.056

Sprang-Capelle is a former municipality in the North Brabant province of the Netherlands. It was formed in 1923 as a merger of the municipalities of Sprang, Vrijhoeve-Capelle and 's Grevelduin-Capelle. Therefore Sprang-Capelle consists of three villages: 's Grevelduin-Capelle, Vrijhoeve-Capelle and Sprang. In 1997 the municipality of Sprang-Capelle was added to the municipality of Waalwijk. The amusement park Efteling is located in the neighbourhood of Sprang-Capelle.

== Gallery ==
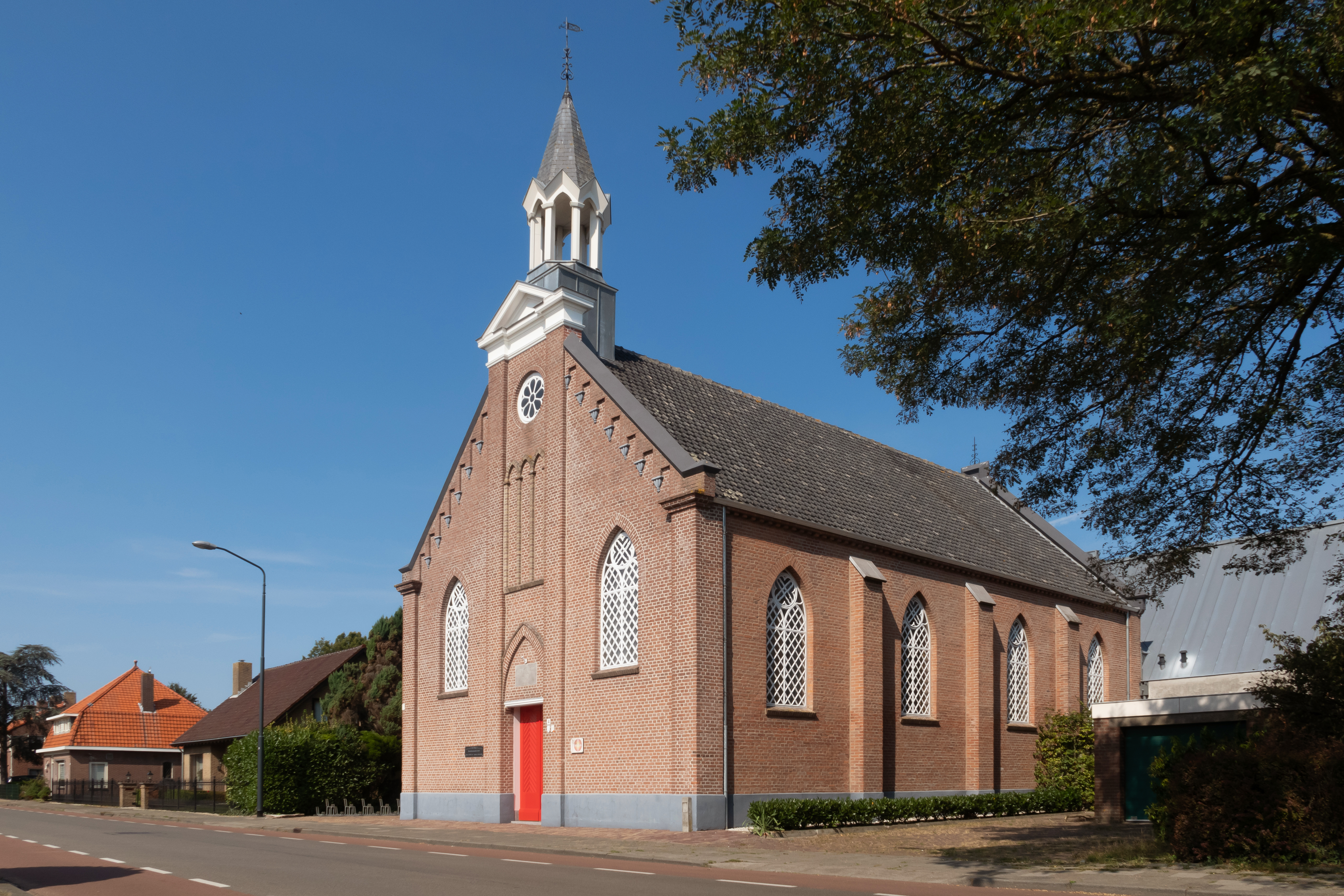
Reformed church: De Brug

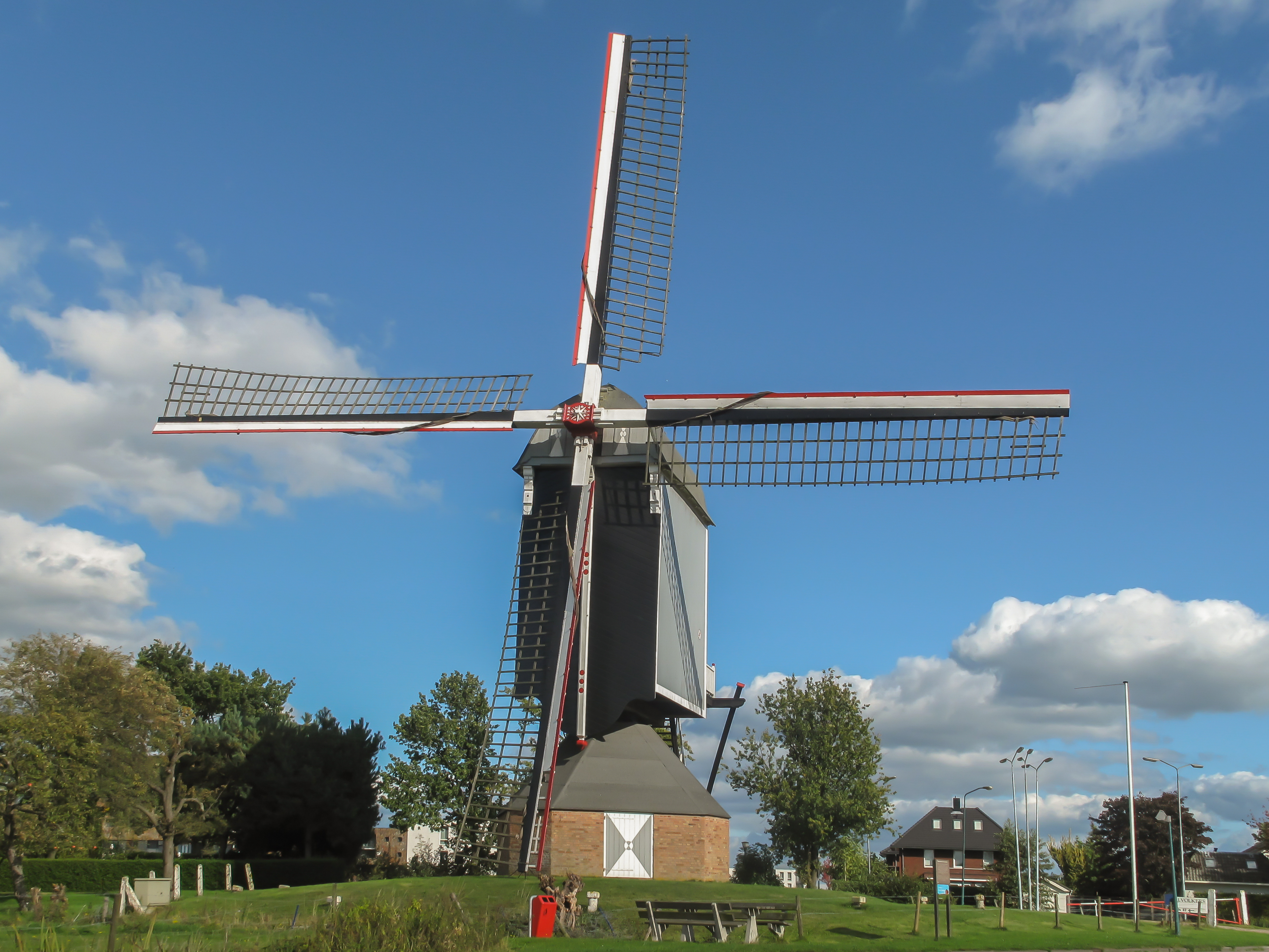
Windmill: korenmolen Dye Spancke

== Notable people ==
- Arnold Stam (born 1968), speed skater
