= Museumpark =

Park in Rotterdam, Netherlands

Coordinates: 51.913°N 4.474°E

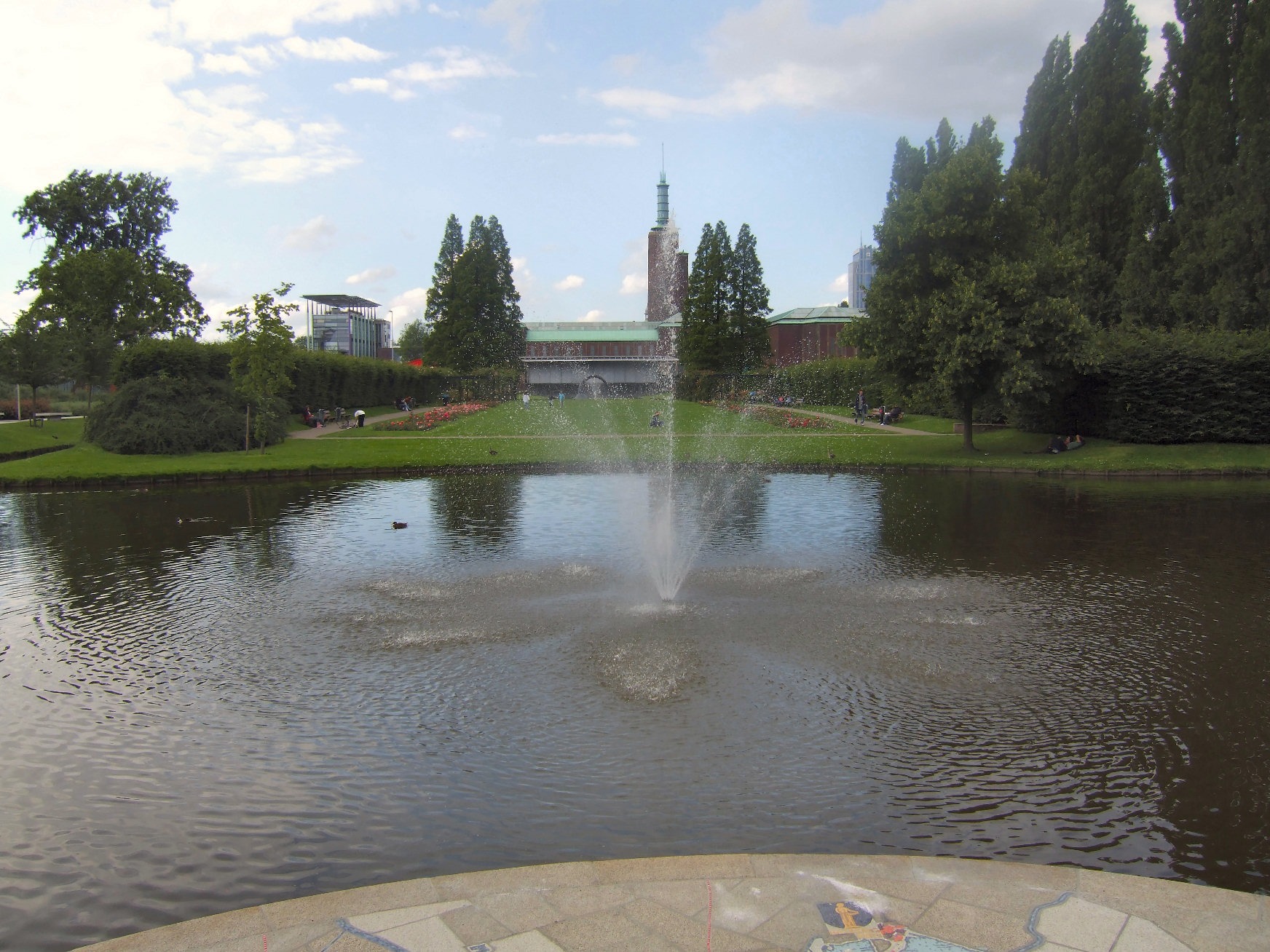
- Museumpark with Museum Boijmans Van Beuningen in the background in 2007
- Interactive map of Museumpark
- Type: Urban park
- Location: Rotterdam Centrum
- Created: 1927

Museumpark is an urban park in Rotterdam, Netherlands, located between the Museum Boijmans Van Beuningen, Westersingel, Westzeedijk and the complex of the Erasmus MC, a medical centre affiliated with the Erasmus University.

The park lies on the former land of the Hoboken family, who lived in the building that is since 1987 the Natuurhistorisch Museum Rotterdam. The park was laid out in 1927 to the design of the architect Witteveen. On the south side of the pond in the park a monument for Gerrit Jongh, director of municipal works in Rotterdam. There are several artworks in the park, so it also serves as a sculpture garden.

There are a number of museums located in the vicinity of the park, hence the name:

- The Netherlands Architecture Institute (NAi), since 2013 Het Nieuwe Instituut
- Museum Boijmans Van Beuningen and its new Depot, opened on November 5, 2021
- The Chabot Museum
- The Kunsthal
- Huis Sonneveld
- Natuurhistorisch Museum Rotterdam
