= Kees Moeliker =

Dutch biologist (born 1960)

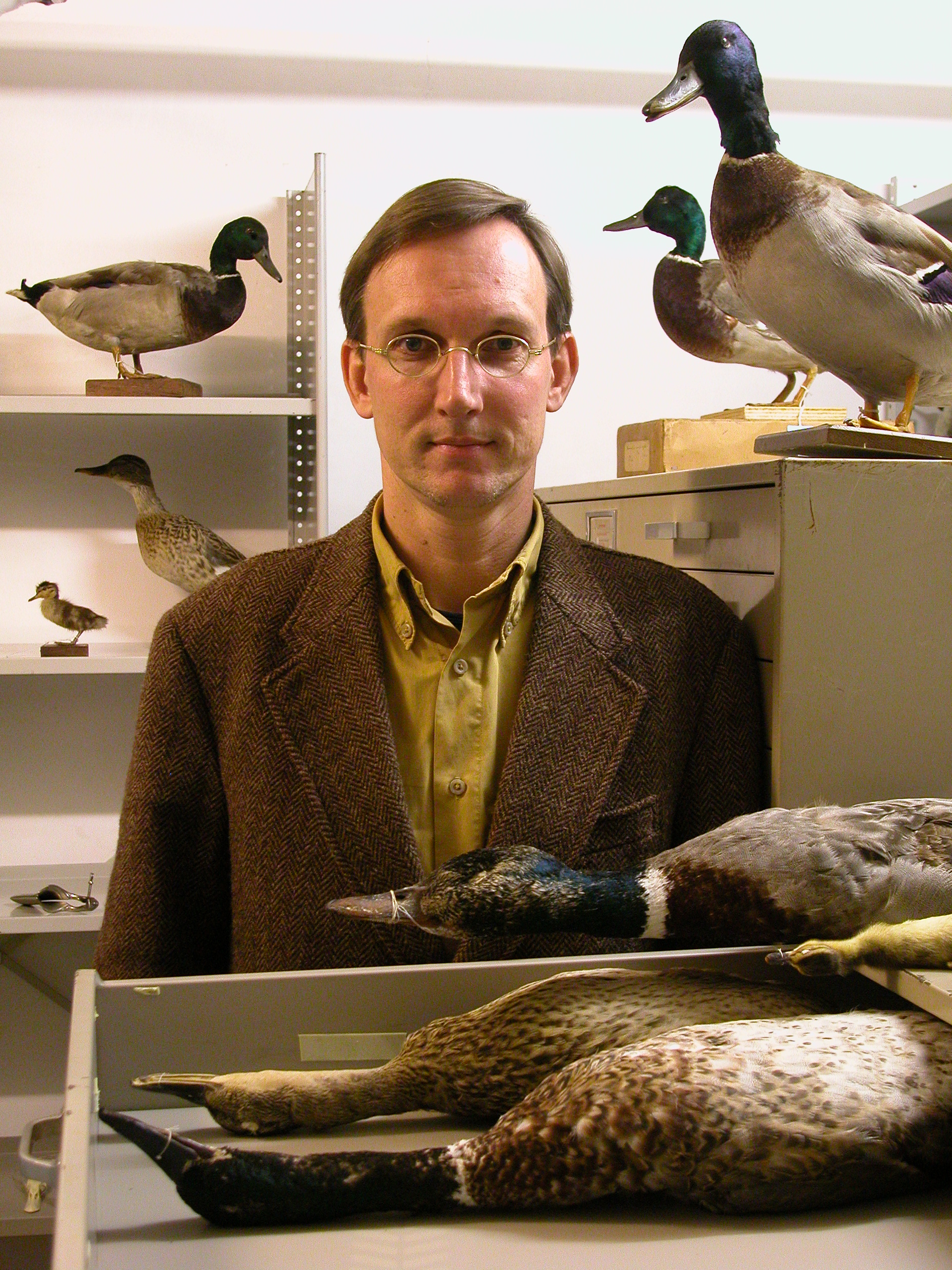
- Moeliker with ducks in the Natural History Museum Rotterdam in 2004
- Born: Cornelis W. Moeliker; 1960 (age 65–66)
- Known for: Research and TED Talk about observing homosexual necrophilia in a mallard duck
- Awards: Ig Nobel Prize for Biology (2003)
- Scientific career
- Fields: Zoology, ornithology
- Workplaces: Director of the Natural History Museum Rotterdam.
- Website: moeliker.wordpress.com

Cornelis W. "Kees" Moeliker (born 9 October 1960) is a Dutch biologist and former curator and director of the Natural History Museum Rotterdam. He is also European Bureau Chief of the Annals of Improbable Research.

== Early years ==
Moeliker's father worked for forty years as a technical illustrator for the (subsequently superseded) Dutch post office. Kees himself was provided with education at the Pieter Caland School in Rotterdam. During this time he used to wander across the nature reserves in the Rotterdam area. On one of his walks, in 1973, he made the first ever recorded observation in the area of an Egyptian Nile goose (Alopochen aegyptiacus).

He went on to study biology and geography at a teacher training institution in Delft. He graduated with a research project on the winter-season feeding ecology of the Long eared owl (Asio otus). The research later provided the basis for a section in his 1989 compilation, "Owls" ("Uilen"). Moeliker also collaborated on the research led by the high-profile Biology/Ornithology Professor Kees Heij, undertaken at the Free University (Amsterdam) into the population ecology of the House Sparrow (Passer domesticus) in Rotterdam.

== Professional career ==
Before he joined the Natural History Museum Rotterdam, Moeliker worked as an assistant-butcher, an English teacher in Istanbul, a nature guide in Costa Rica and a biology teacher at several high schools. He joined the museum, initially as an educational assistant, in 1989. From 1999 to 2015 he was the museum's curator and head of communications. From 2015 to 2025 he was the museum's director.

In 1991, together with Kees Heij, he discovered a Boano monarch (Monarcha boanensis), a bird that had been thought extinct, on the island of Boano, in the Indonesian province of Maluku. A subsequent Moeliker rediscovery, in 2001, involved the Waigeo brush-turkey (Aepypodius bruijnii) he identified in Waigeo Island, Southwest Papua. With Erwin J.O. Kompanje, Moeliker identified and described a subspecies of Long-tongued nectar bat (Macroglossus minimus booensis), of which the known habitat is restricted to the little Island of Boo in the east of Indonesia.

Amongst his work for the Natural History Museum Rotterdam, Moeliker preserved the Domino Day 2005 sparrow, a house sparrow that was shot and killed by a hunter after it knocked down a large domino display in Leeuwarden. The bird was stuffed and is now mounted on a box of dominos.

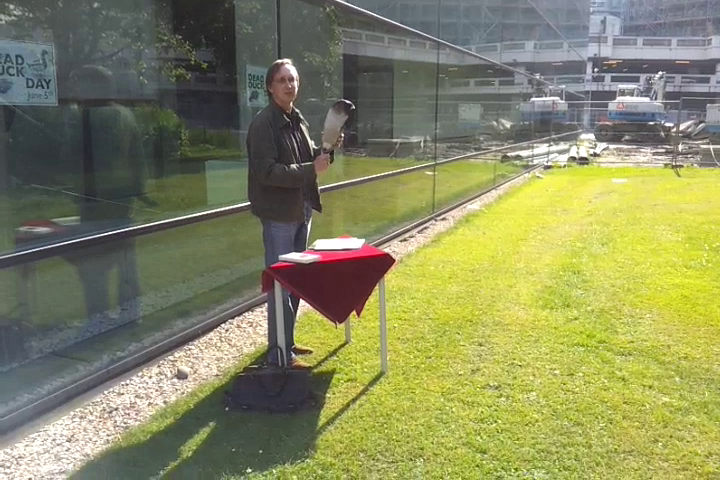
Kees Moeliker officiating at "his" museum's sixteenth Dead Duck Day (2012)

Moeliker has written three books: De eendenman (which translates to The Duck Guy) in 2009; De Bilnaad van de Teek, which translates to The Butt Crack of the Tick, in 2012; and De kikker kamasutra (which translates to The Frog Kamasutra) in 2024. De Bilnaad van de Teek was voted "best science book of the year" by the newspaper de Volkskrant that year.

== Recognition ==
He won the 2003 Ig Nobel Prize for biology for his study of homosexual necrophilia in male mallards.

He was nominated in 2013 for the Edgar Doncker Prize in recognition of his outstanding contribution to the Rotterdam Natural History Museum and to conservation more generally.

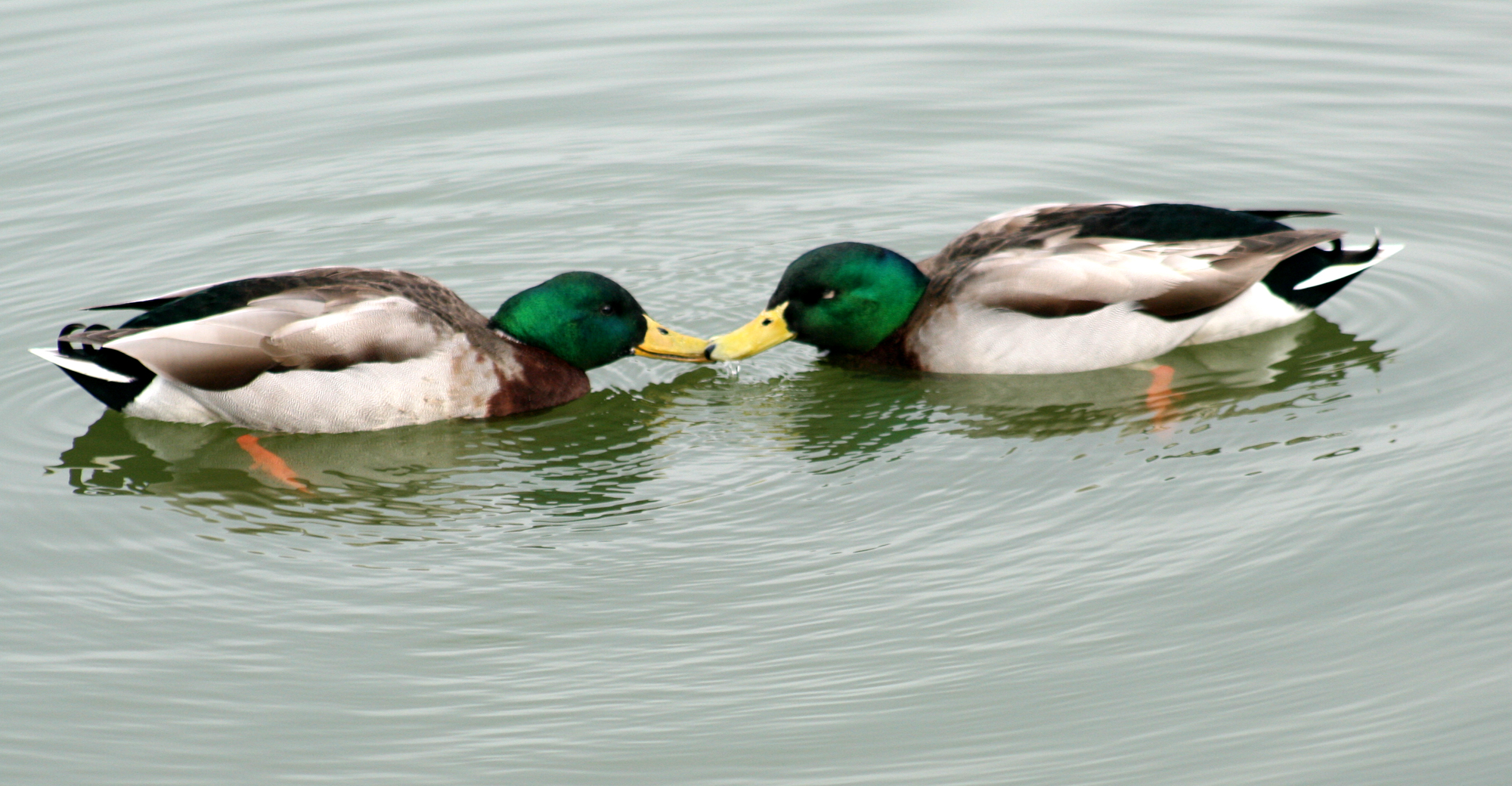
Two male Mallards, Anas platyrhynchos

After Moeliker won his Ig Nobel Prize, he earned the nickname of "The Duck Guy". He appears annually at the Ig Nobel Prize ceremony in Boston, Massachusetts, and is a regular performer on the Ig Nobel Prize's tours of the United Kingdom. On one tour, on 11 March 2014, a mini-opera based on his study entitled The Homosexual Necrophiliac Duck Opera was premiered at Imperial College London. It was composed by Daniel Gillingwater, with Moeliker performing a duck call. A Dead Duck Day is held on 5 June every year, "to commemorate the first anniversary of the sudden and dramatic death (on 5 June 1995) of the mallard (Anas platyrhynchos) that entered the scientific literature as the first victim of homosexual necrophilia in this species."

On 6 October 2014, he made a guest appearance on BBC Radio 4 comedy The Museum of Curiosity and donated a single pubic louse to the museum. During the programme the presenter John Lloyd observed that Kees Moeliker did not have an English-language Wikipedia page but only a Dutch-language one. Lloyd went on to state: "We're going to make one about you for the English Wikipedia". Jimmy Wales, the co-founder of Wikipedia, who was also a guest on the programme, replied that that was unnecessary because Wikipedians listen to the show and he predicted that an English-language page for Kees Moeliker would be created before the airing of the programme had finished. Approximately 8 minutes later, and 7 minutes before the programme finished being aired, the first version of this page had been submitted.

== See also ==
- List of Ig Nobel Prize winners
