= Drongelen, Haagoort, Gansoijen en Doeveren =

Coordinates: 51°42′54″N 5°03′15″E

Drongelen, Haagoort, Gansoijen en Doeveren (or "Drongelen c.a.") is a former municipality in the Dutch province of North Brabant. It included the villages of Drongelen and Doeveren, and the two former hamlets Hagoort and Gansoijen.

The two hamlets Hagoort and Gansoijen were destroyed in the construction of the Bergsche Maas canal in 1904. The municipality changed its name to just "Drongelen" in 1908.
