= Natural History Museum Rotterdam =

- Natuurhistorisch Museum Rotterdam
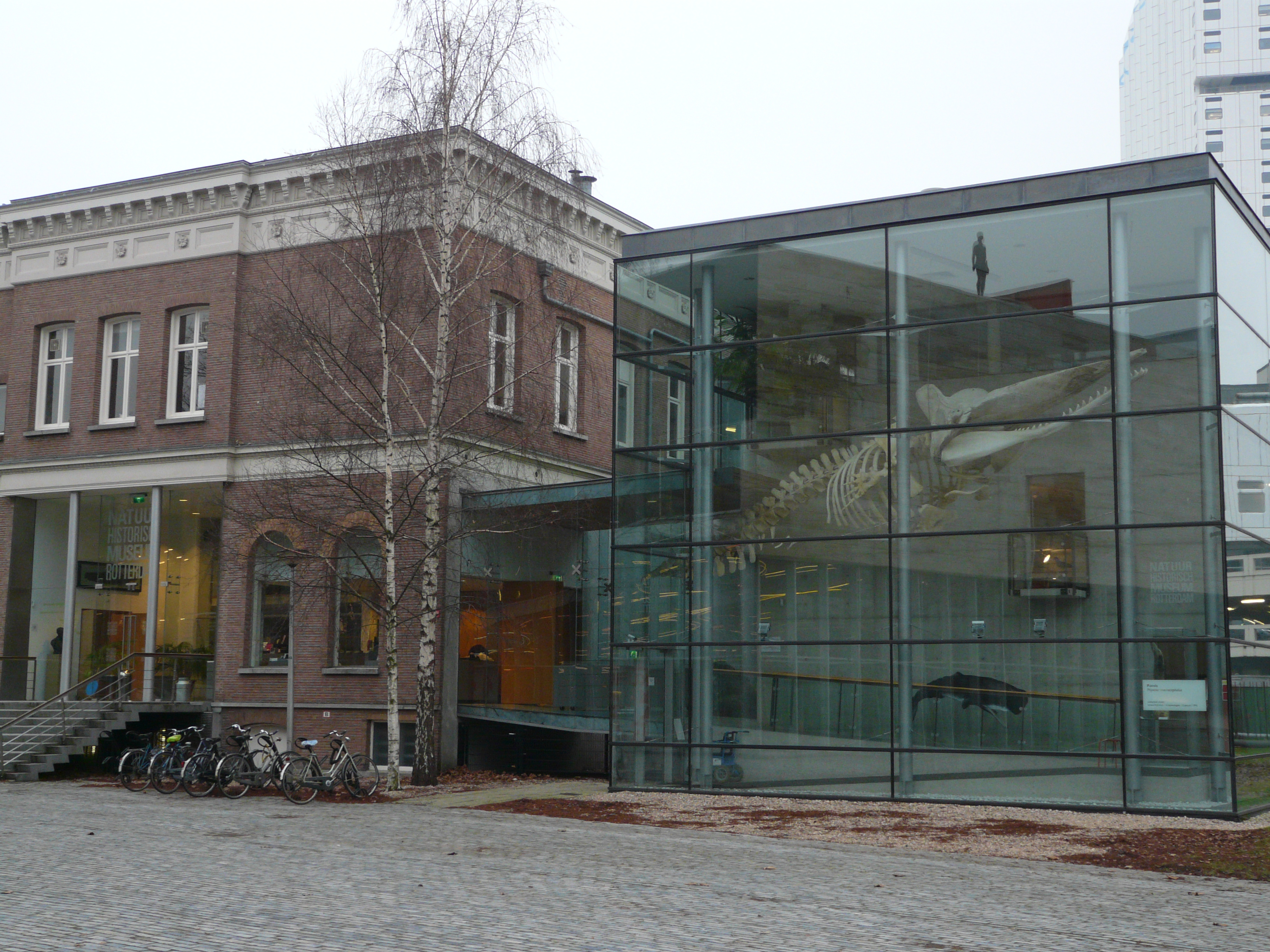
- The Natuurhistorisch Museum in 2010

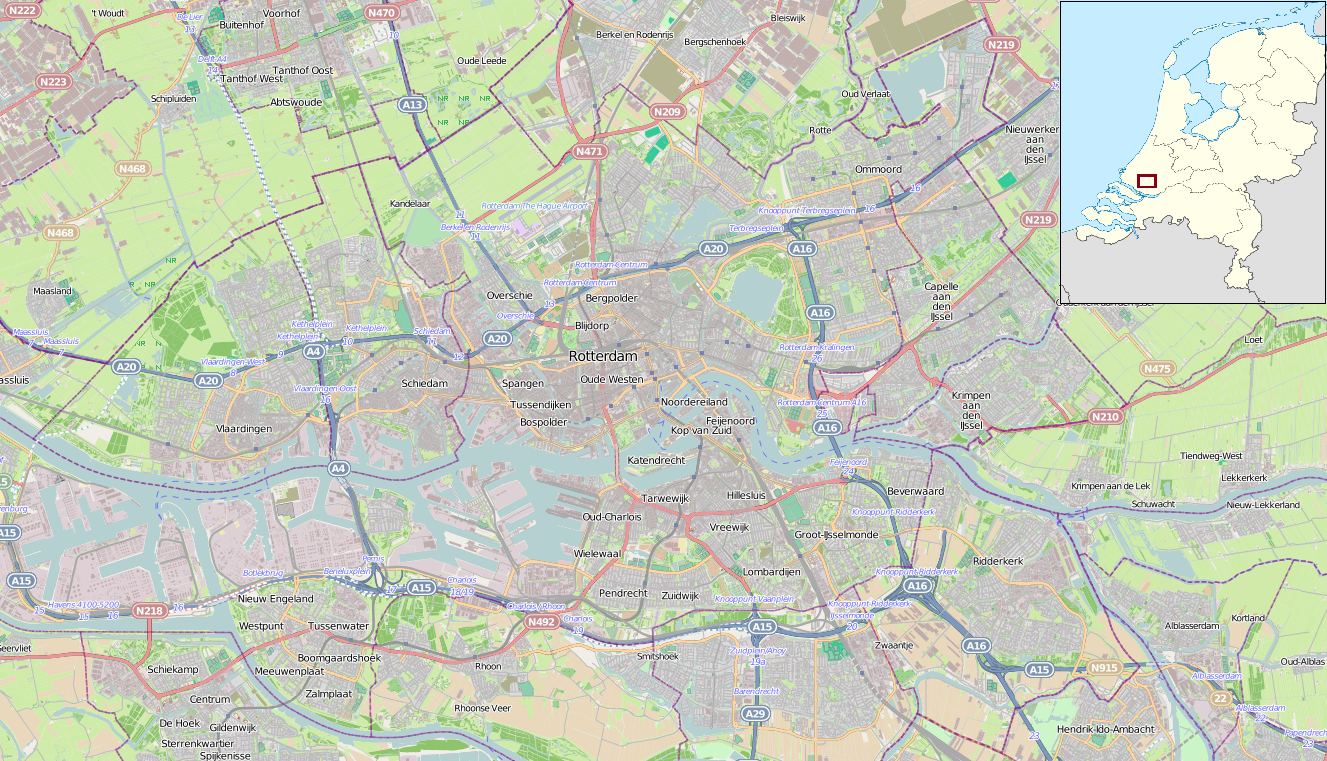
- Location in Rotterdam
- Established: 1927
- Location: Westzeedijk 345; Rotterdam, Netherlands
- Coordinates: 51.9108°N 4.4725°E
- Type: Natural history museum
- Collection size: 400,000 objects
- Visitors: 44,009 (2015)
- Director: Kees Moeliker
- Curator: Bram Langeveld
- Public transit access: Kievitslaan (tram line 8); Museumpark (tram line 20)
- Website: www.hetnatuurhistorisch.nl

The Natuurhistorisch Museum Rotterdam (Dutch pronunciation: [naːˈtyːrɦɪsˌtoːris myˈzeːjʏm ˌrɔtərˈdɑm]; English: Natural History Museum Rotterdam) is a natural history museum located in Rotterdam, Netherlands.

The museum opened in 1927. It had 44,009 visitors in 2015.

== History ==
In 1922, the Rotterdam section of the Nederlandsche Natuurhistorische Vereeniging (Dutch Natural History Association) founded the Vereeniging tot Oprichting en Instandhouding van een Natuurhistorisch Museum (Association for Establishing and Maintaining a Natural History Museum). In 1927, the Natuurhistorisch Museum (Natural History Museum) opened.

== Location ==
The museum is located in Villa Dijkzigt at the Museumpark, close to the Kunsthal and Museum Boijmans Van Beuningen.

The villa dates from 1852 and was originally built by J. F. Metzelaar for the Van Hoboken family. In 1995 it was extended with a modern glazed pavilion which was designed by the Dutch architect Erick van Egeraat.

The museum includes a shop and a library.

== Collection ==
The museum has a collection of an estimated 400,000 objects of which 253,119 objects are registered.

== Administration ==
Kees Moeliker has been the museum director since 2015. Bram Langeveld has been the museum curator since 2016.

The museum had 37,814 visitors in 2012 and 44,009 in 2015.
