= Capelle =

- Village
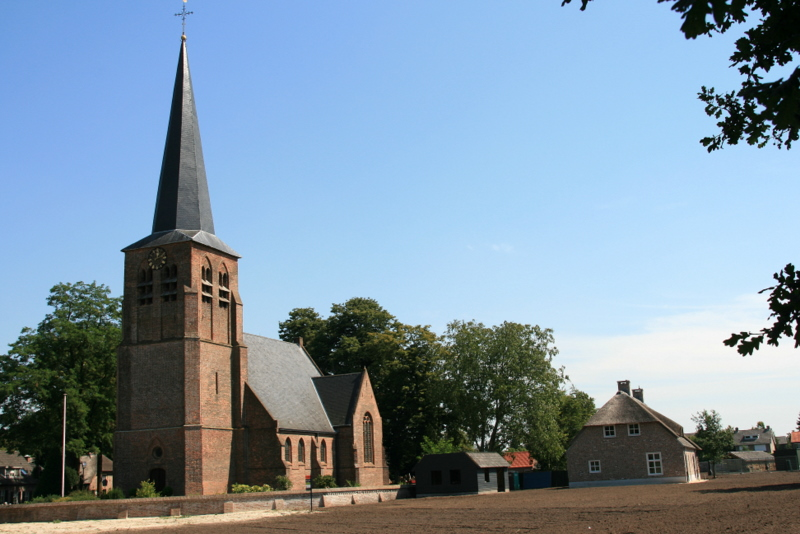
- Old St Willibrordus Church

- Location in the province of North Brabant in the Netherlands Capelle (Netherlands)
- Coordinates: 51°41′32″N 4°59′7″E
- Country: Netherlands
- Province: North Brabant
- Municipality: Waalwijk

Area
  - Total: 18.90 km^{2} (7.30 sq mi)
- Elevation: 1.4 m (4.6 ft)

Population (2021)
  - Total: 2,800
  - Density: 150/km^{2} (380/sq mi)
- Time zone: UTC+1 (CET)
  - Summer (DST): UTC+2 (CEST)
- Postal code: 5161
- Dialing code: 0416

Capelle (also Kapelle) is a village in the Dutch province of North Brabant. It is located about 6 km west of Waalwijk.

The village was first mentioned in 1257 as Capella, and means chapel. The original village was flooded in the St. Elizabeth's flood of 1421. The Dutch Reformed church dates from 1750 and has a wooden domed tower.

Capelle was home to 144 people in 1840. Capelle was a separate municipality until 1923, when it merged with Sprang and Vrijhoeve-Capelle. They formed the new municipality of Sprang-Capelle, which existed until 1997. The village was flooded during the North Sea flood of 1953 and 42 people died. The municipality decided not to rebuild the village. Since 1997 Capelle has been part of the municipality of Waalwijk.
