= Carel van Lier =

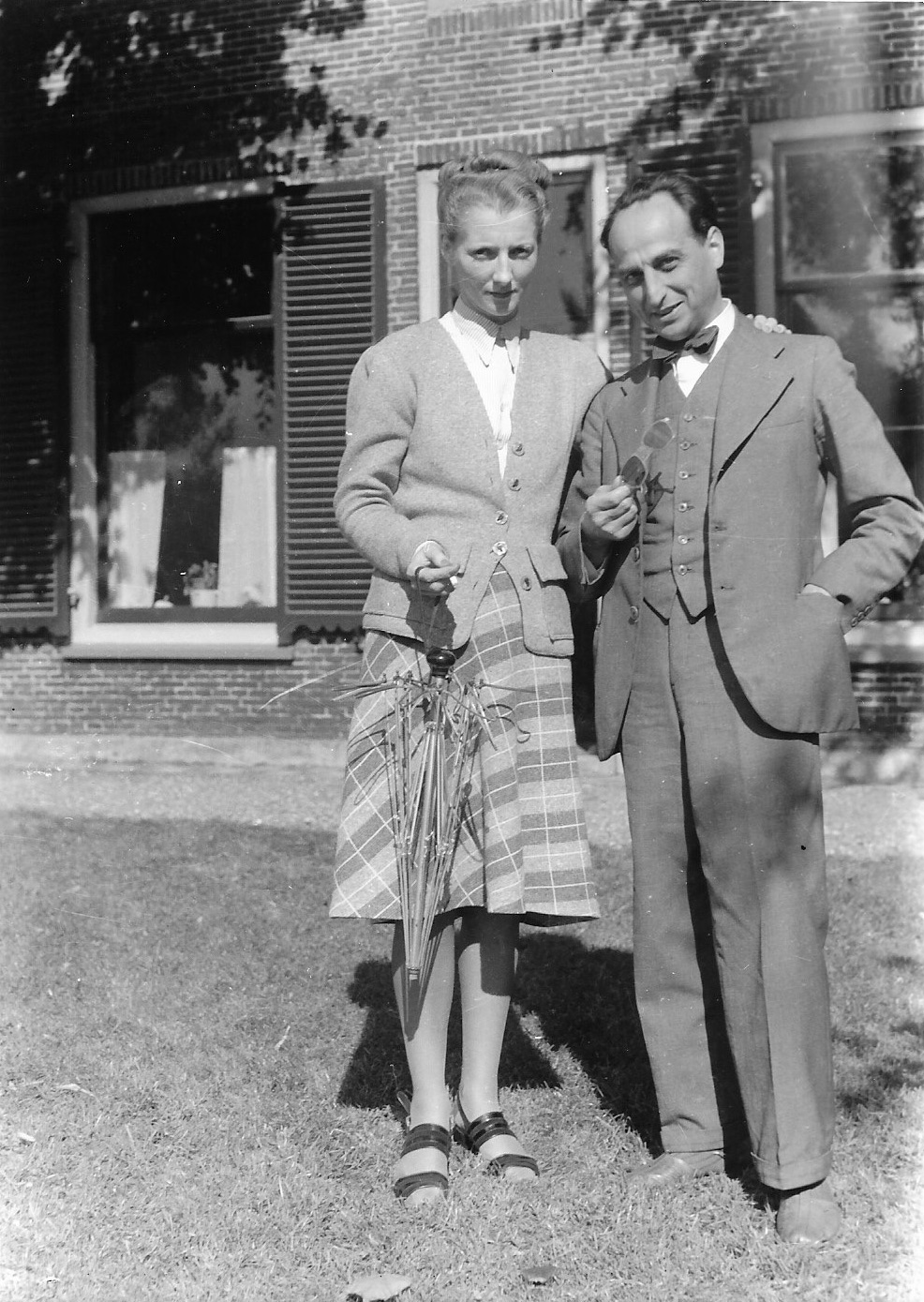
Carel van Lier met Wilma Willink

Charles (Carel) van Lier (The Hague, September 5, 1897 - Hannover-Mühlenberg, March 15, 1945) was a Dutch Jewish art dealer deported in World War II who died in 1945 in a concentration camp

== Personal life ==
Carel van Lier was the son of Samuel van Lier and Franciska Adelaar.

He married twice and lived in Blaricum after his second marriage.

== Career ==
In 1927, Van Lier opened the Kunstzaal Van Lier at the Rokin 126 in Amsterdam. He exhibited works by contemporary artists from the movements of realism, magical realism, expressionism, as well as ethnography, African and Asia art

Artists who exhibited with him before the Second World War included Henk Chabot, Edgar Fernhout and Rachel Fernhout-Pellekaan, Jan van Herwijnen, Raoul Hynckes, Dick Ket, Wim Schumacher, Jan Sluijters, Charley Toorop, Henri van de Velde and Carel Willink.

== Nazi-era arrest, deportation and death ==
After Nazi Germany invaded the Netherlands in May 1940 Van Lier was persecuted because of his Jewish descent. His art gallery was put under "Aryan" management in 1942. On April 6 or 7, 1943, he was arrested by the Germans in Blaricum. Together with Willem Arondeus, he helped artists in hiding by arranging false identity cards for them.

He was imprisoned in the Amstelveenseweg in Amsterdam and then sent to Westerbork via camp Amersfoort. On 23 March 1944, he was deported to Auschwitz, where he had to work in the Laurahütte. Via Mauthausen and Neuengamme. He died in the Hannover-Mühlenberg satellite camp in 1945.

== Legacy ==
After the war, the art dealership was continued by his widow until 1949 and then by others until 1956.

In 2003, TOTH published a description of his life and his art gallery by the hand of his grandson under the title "Carel van Lier - Art dealer, trailblazer, 1897 - 1945", taken from an article written about him by Lier in 1929.

== Restitution claims ==
Van Lier died in Mühlenberg concentration camp in Germany between 1 and 15 March 1945. On 30 March 2007, the grandson of the Amsterdam-based art dealer ‘Carel van Lier’ submitted a restitution claim to the Dutch Restitution Committee for artworks sold to the' Museum für Völkerkunde in Frankfurt am Main 'in Germany on 11 April 1941. However the Dutch committee rejected the claim stating "were sold by Van Lier himself and that there is no evidence that this sale was the result of any direct threat or coercion on the part of the Nazi authorities"

== Lawsuits Nazi-looted art ==
- Grosz v. Museum of Modern Art, 772 F. Supp. 2d 473 (S.D.N.Y. 2010)

== Research projects ==
- The Krefeld Art Museums is conducting a study "with Regard to Colonial Contexts"
