= Waalwijk =

- Municipality
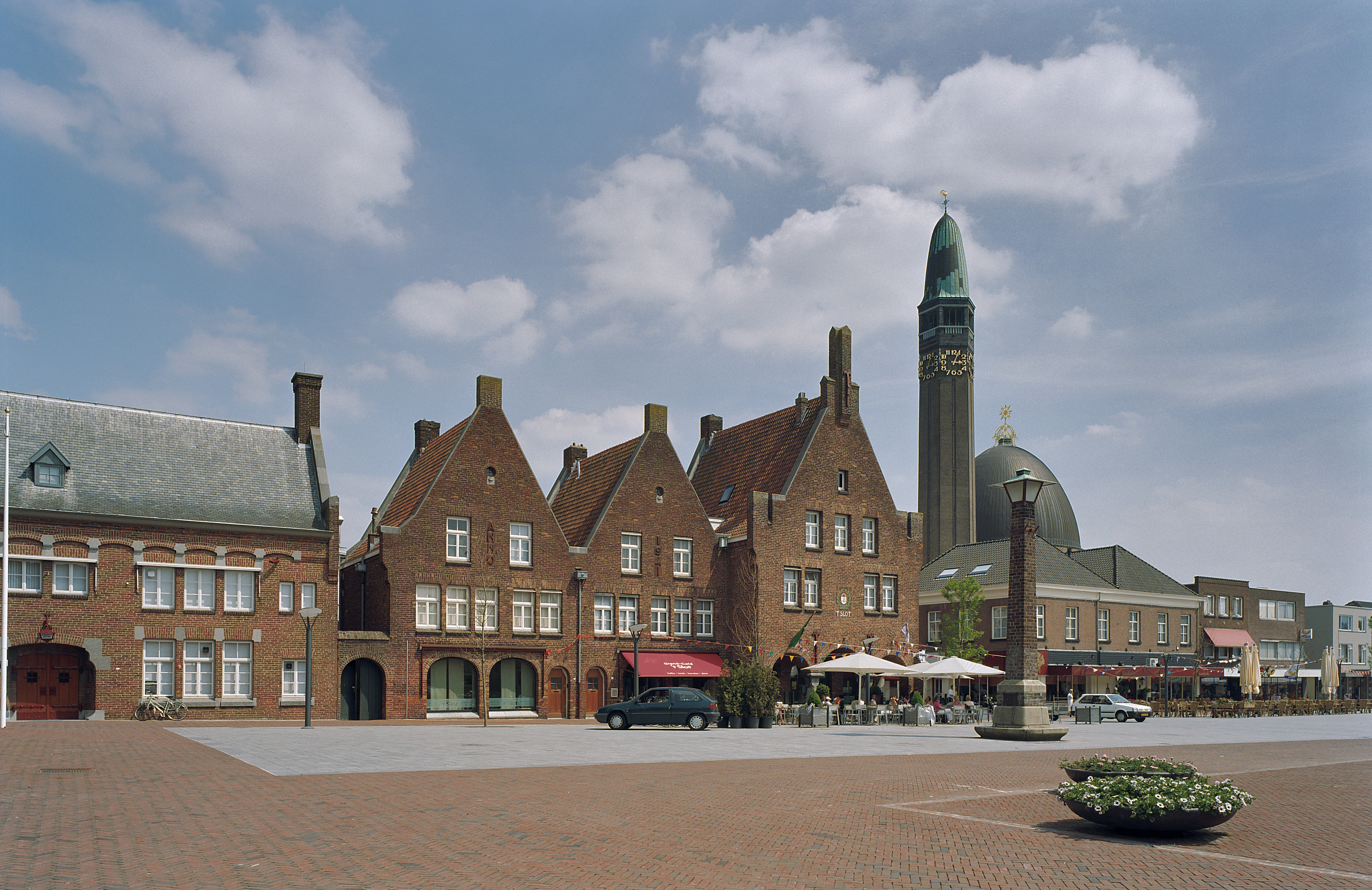
- Square in Waalwijk with restaurants and church

- Flag Coat of arms

- Location in North Brabant
- Coordinates: 51°41′N 5°4′E
- Country: Netherlands
- Province: Noord-Brabant

Government
  - Body: Municipal council
  - Mayor: Sacha Ausems (Ind.)

Area
  - Total: 67.65 km^{2} (26.12 sq mi)
  - Land: 64.58 km^{2} (24.93 sq mi)
  - Water: 3.07 km^{2} (1.19 sq mi)
- Elevation: 2 m (6.6 ft)

Population (January 2021)
  - Total: 48,815
  - Density: 756/km^{2} (1,960/sq mi)
- Demonym: Waalwijker
- Time zone: UTC+01:00 (CET)
  - Summer (DST): UTC+02:00 (CEST)
- Postcode: 5140–5146, 5160–5165
- Area code: 0416
- Website: Official website

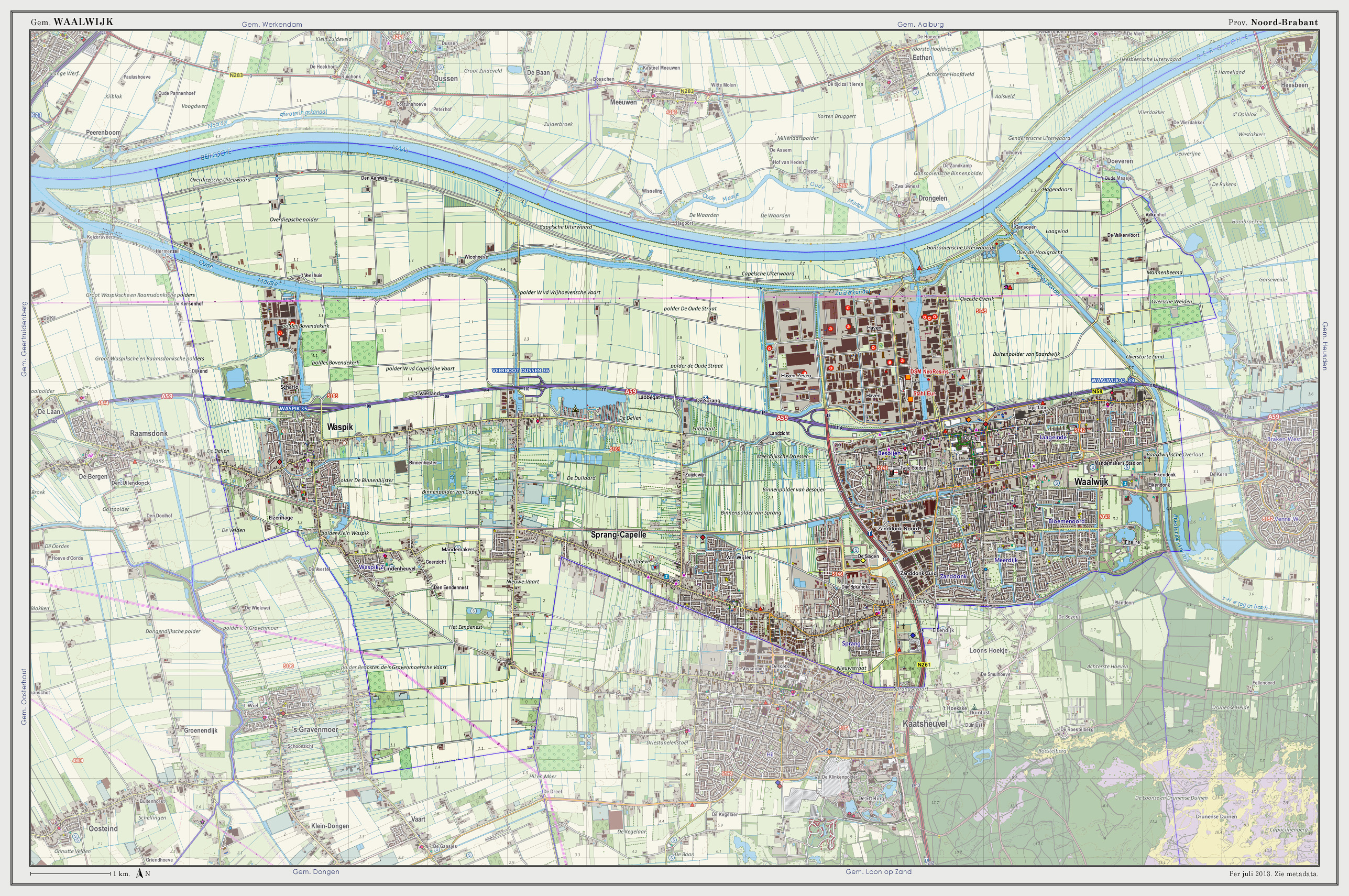
Dutch topographic map of Waalwijk, July 2013

Waalwijk (Dutch pronunciation: [ˈʋaːlʋɛik]) is a municipality and a city in the southern Netherlands. It had a population of 48,815 in 2021 and is located near the A59 and N261 motorways. The villages of Capelle, Vrijhoeve-Capelle, Sprang (the former municipality of Sprang-Capelle) and Waspik together with the city of Waalwijk form the municipality of Waalwijk. The city has an old town center, which has recently been modernized.

== Population centers ==
- Capelle
- Vrijhoeve-Capelle
- Sprang
- Waalwijk
- Waspik

== The city of Waalwijk ==
Waalwijk is a city in North Brabant that lies north of Tilburg and west of 's-Hertogenbosch. To its north runs the Bergse Maas canal, with the River Waal further to the north.

Waalwijk used to be known for its shoe business.

Waalwijk was granted city rights in 1303. The professional football team RKC plays in Waalwijk.

Waalwijk is also known for an event in the city and surroundings: the "80 van de langstraat", held every September, in which a few thousand people make an 80-km walk through all towns that are part of the Langstraat region.

Some other events:

- Waalwijk Modestad (Waalwijk Fashion City), a weekend full of fashion
- Nacht van het levenslied (Night of the "Dutch song"), where Dutch and local singers perform
- Straattheaterfestival (street theatre festival), a weekend full of street performers and theatre acts

== Twin towns – sister cities ==
Waalwijk is twinned with:

- Chojnice, Poland
- Unna, Germany
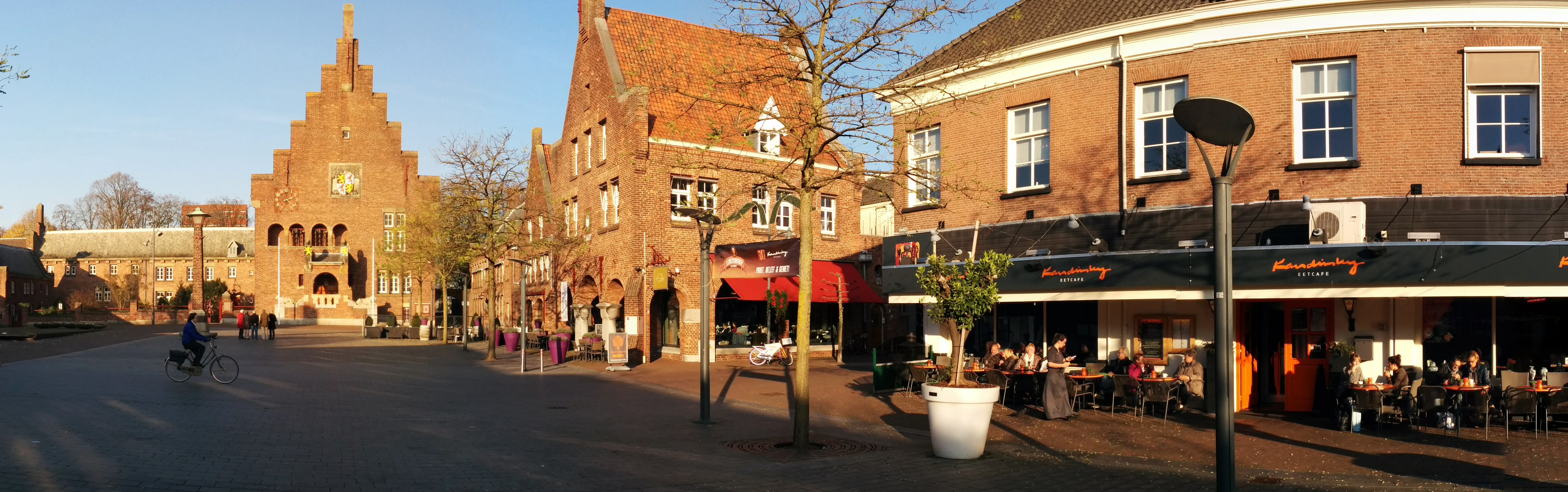
Town hall and city centre

== Notable people from Waalwijk ==
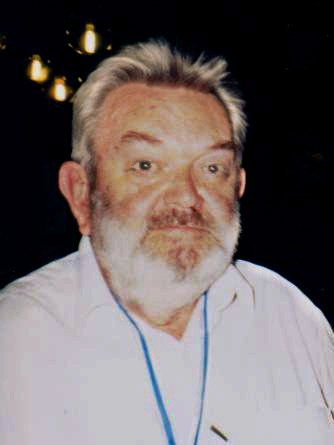
Martinus Veltman, 2005

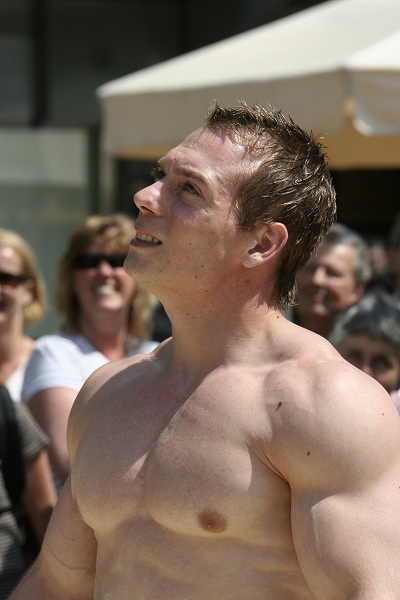
Yuri van Gelder, 2008

- Valensia, a Dutch composer, producer and multi-instrumentalist. Grew up in Waalwijk.
- Willem Hendrik Johan van Idsinga (1822 in Baardwijk – 1896), politician and Governor of the Dutch Gold Coast and Surinam
- Hendrikus Chabot (1894 in Sprang – 1949), painter and sculptor
- Martinus J. G. Veltman (born 1931 in Waalwijk – 2021), theoretical physicist, joint winner of the 1999 Nobel Prize in Physics for work on particle theory
- René Mioch (born 1959 in Waalwijk), journalist, presenter for radio and TV and actor
- Jan-Hein Kuijpers (born 1968 in Waalwijk), lawyer and columnist
- Wieki Somers (born 1976 in Sprang-Capelle), designer
- Olcay Gulsen (born 1980 in Waalwijk), fashion designer
- Ariën van Weesenbeek (born 1980 in Waalwijk), drummer with the Dutch metal band Epica
- Bas van Daalen (born 1996 in Waalwijk), known as Will Grands, record producer, singer and songwriter

=== Sport ===
- Frans Slaats (born 1912 in Waalwijk – 1993), professional cyclist who broke the world hour record
- Arnold Stam (born 1968), speed skater
- Ramon van Haaren (born 1972 in Waalwijk), former footballer with 291 club caps
- Patrick van Balkom (born 1974 in Waalwijk), former sprinter, competed at the 2004 Summer Olympics
- Jos van Nieuwstadt (born 1979 in Waalwijk), former footballer with 310 club caps
- Yuri van Gelder (born 1983 in Waalwijk), gymnast on the rings, competed at the 2016 Summer Olympics
- Frank van Mosselveld (born 1984 in Waalwijk), former footballer with 266 club caps

== See also ==
- Besoijen
- Baardwijk

== Gallery ==
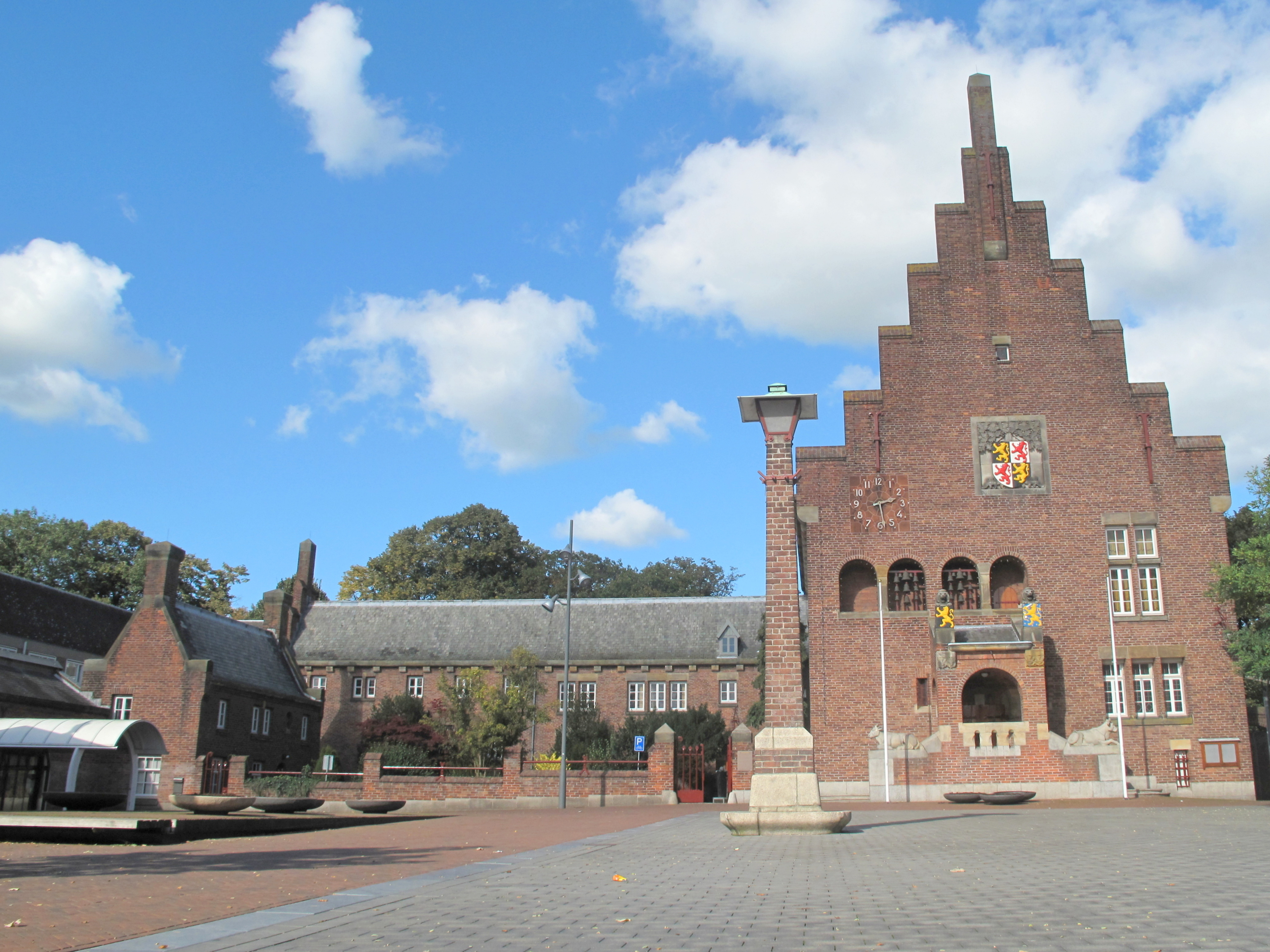
Waalwijk, townhall

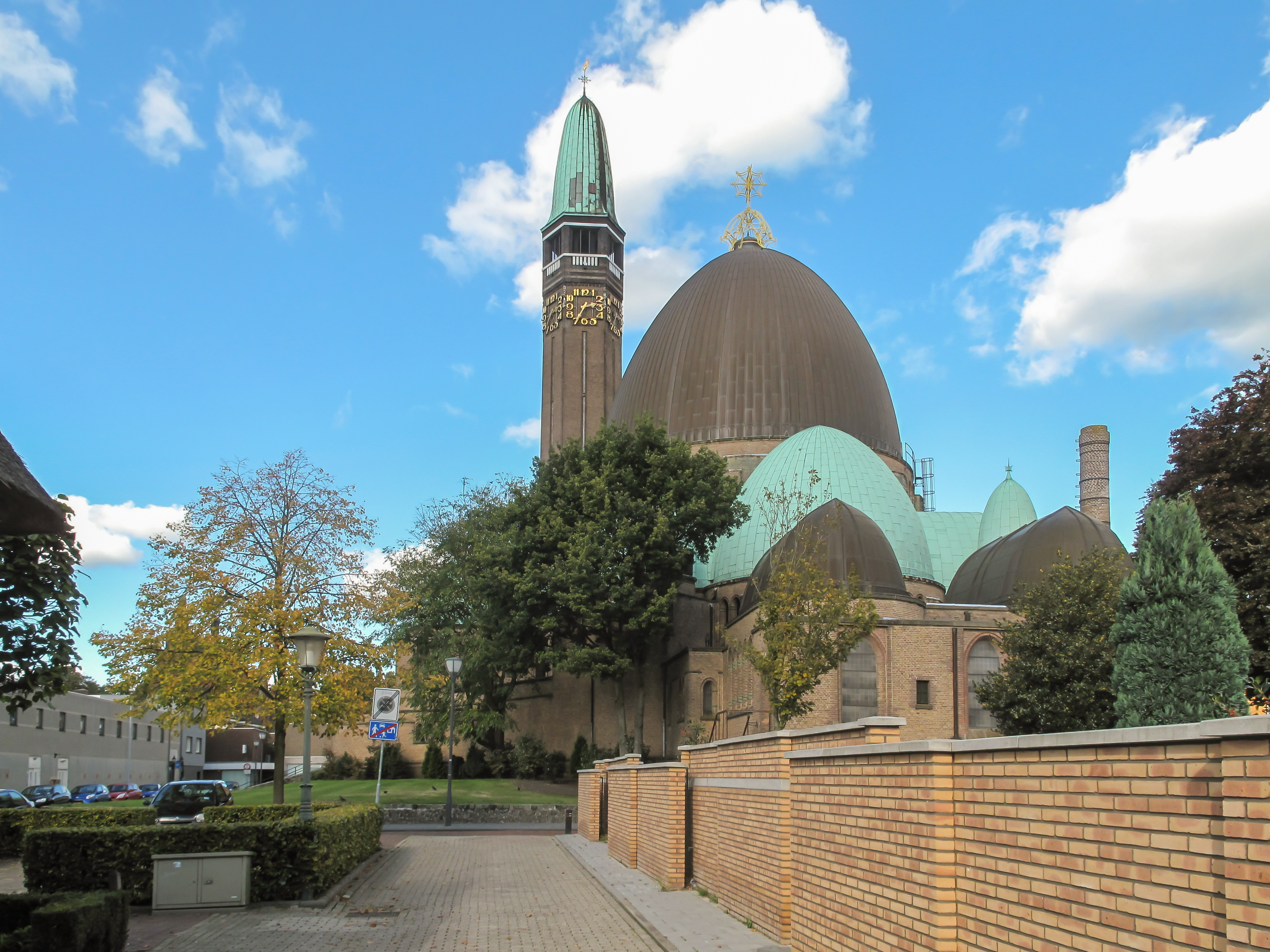
Waalwijk, church: de Sint Janskerk

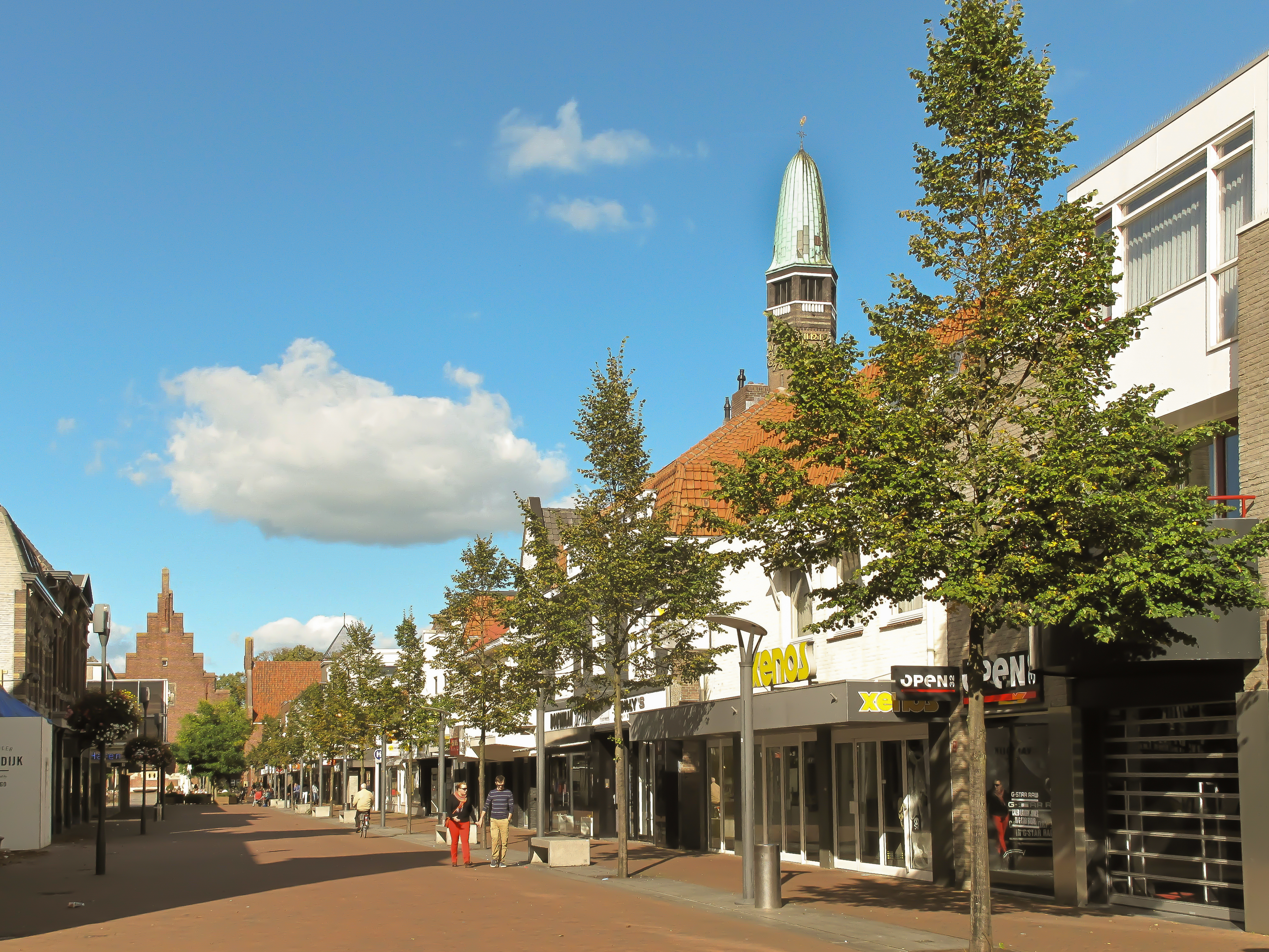
Waalwijk, view to a street: de Stationsstraat

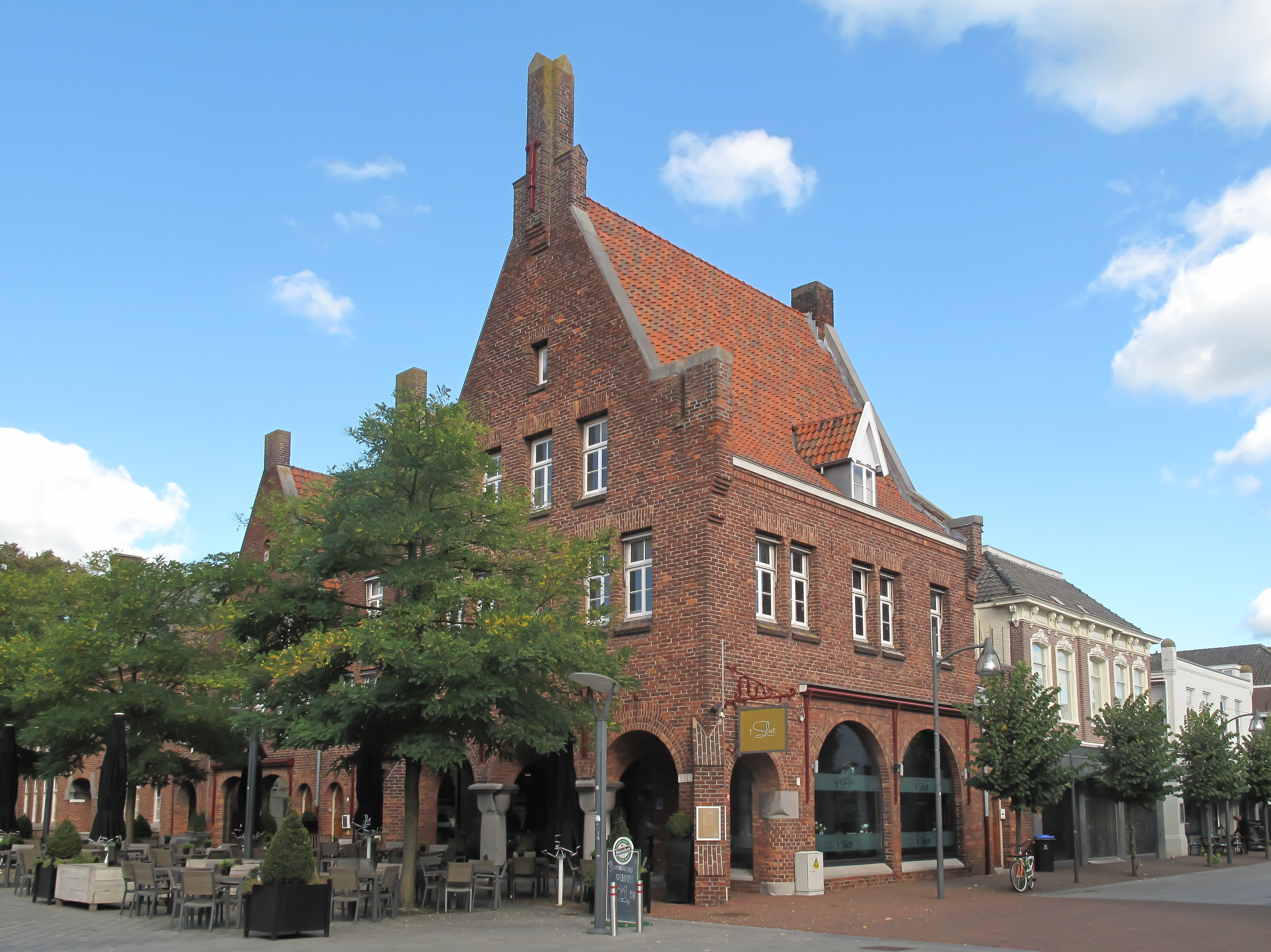
Waalwijk, pub in monumental house
