= Kunsthal =

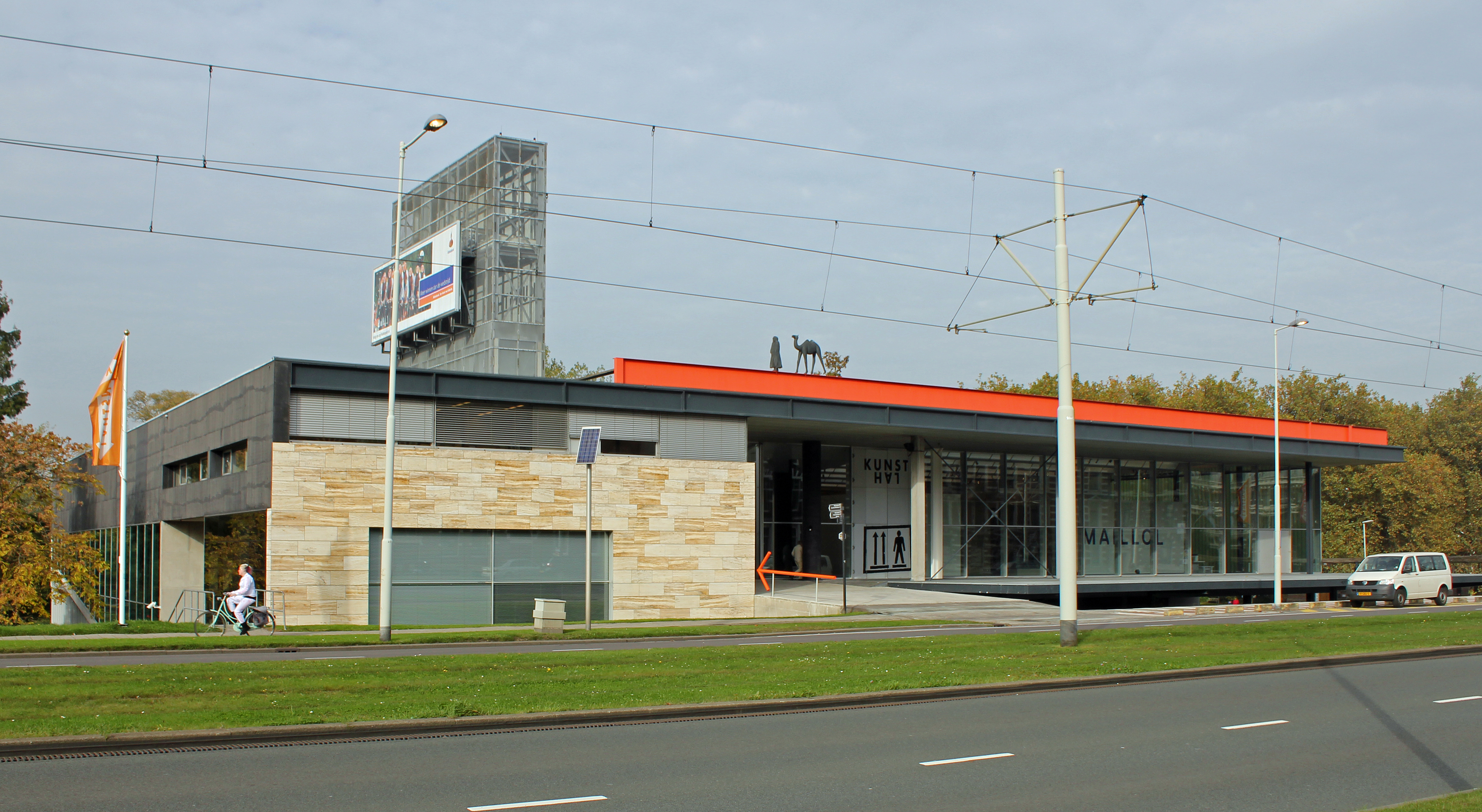
- Front of the museum

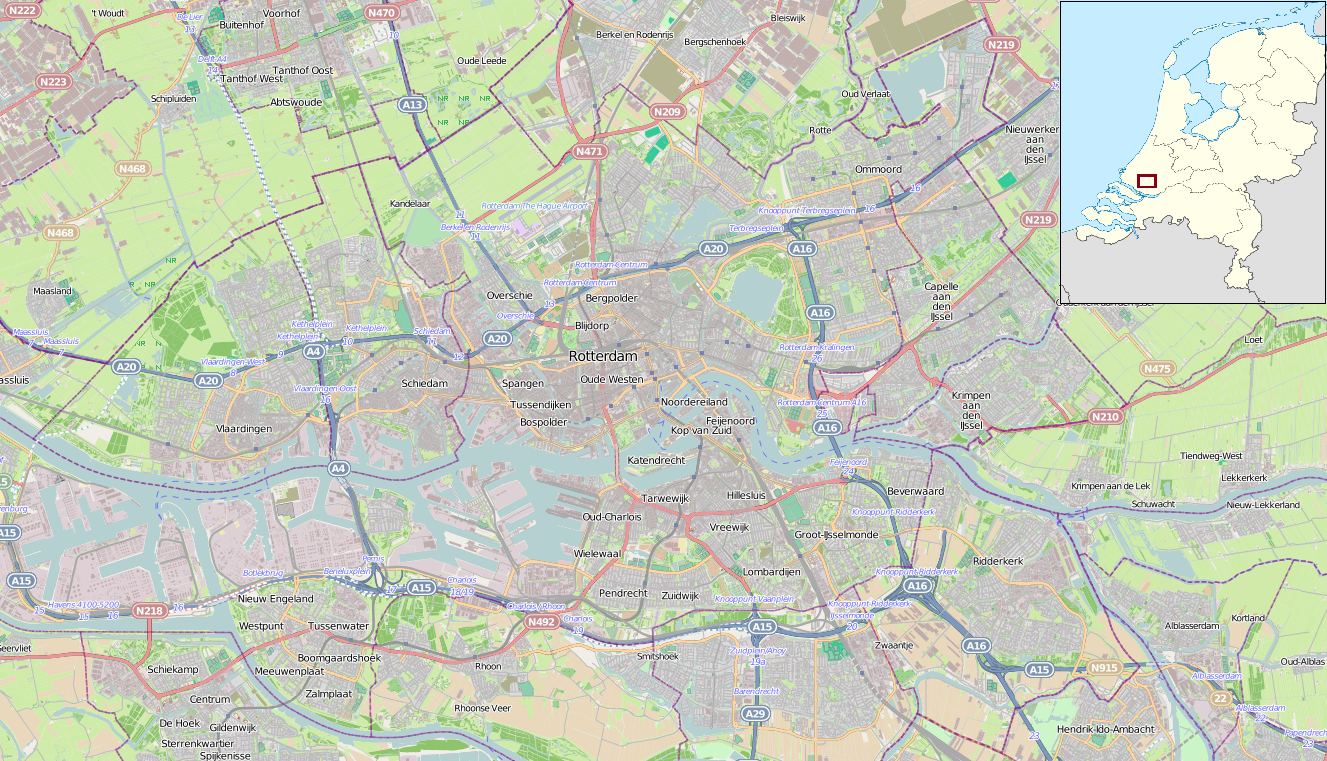
- Location in Rotterdam in the Netherlands
- Established: 1992
- Location: Rotterdam, Netherlands
- Coordinates: 51.911°N 4.473°E
- Type: Art museum
- Visitors: 187,482 (2013)
- Director: Natha ja van Dijk
- Curators: Jannet de Goede; Charlotte van Lingen
- Public transit access: Kievitslaan (tram line 8); Vasteland (tram line 20)
- Website: www.kunsthal.nl

The Kunsthal (Dutch pronunciation: [ˈkʏnstɦɑl]; English: Art Hall) is an art space in Rotterdam, the Netherlands. It opened in 1992.

== Overview ==
The museum is situated in the Museumpark of Rotterdam next to the Natuurhistorisch Museum Rotterdam, and in the vicinity of the Museum Boijmans Van Beuningen. Entrance to the Kunsthal is from the Westzeedijk. The building was designed by the Dutch architect Rem Koolhaas together with project architect Fuminori Hoshino of the architectural firm OMA (Office for Metropolitan Architecture). Wim van Krimpen was its first director.

The Kunsthal has no permanent collection, but organises a wide range of temporary exhibits. The large space available 3,300 m^{2} (36,000 sq ft) allows various exhibits in parallel. It houses seven exhibition spaces, a characteristic auditorium, and a café. The range of exhibitions presented at the Kunsthal ranges from 20th century masters to current contemporary art movements. The entrance on top of the Westzeedijk and gateway to the Museumpark is also a traffic intersection and meeting place for various public flows.

Lately the museum had exhibitions featuring artists such as Chuck Close, Andy Warhol and Arne Quinze. And recently the exhibition Drawn: Rotterdam! One-And-A-Half-Metre-Society about the impact of the COVID-19 pandemic.

== Art theft ==
On October 16, 2012, seven paintings were stolen from the museum. The paintings were Monet's Waterloo Bridge and Charing Cross Bridge, London, Picasso's Tete d'Arlequin, Gauguin's Femme devant une fenêtre ouverte, Matisse's La Liseuse en Blanc et Jaune, De Haan's Autoportrait, and Lucian Freud's Woman with Eyes Closed. At the time the museum was showing avant-garde art work by more than 150 artists from the Triton Foundation as part of their 20th anniversary celebrations. The theft took place that morning at around 3:00 AM. Even though the alarms had gone off the thieves had left the premises by the time police arrived. According to Rotterdam police, "The alarm system in the Kunsthal is supposed to be state of the art. We've got no reason to believe that it's not but somehow the people responsible for this found a way in and a way out." Director of Art Loss Register suspects that the most valuable paintings were targeted and that they could be worth "hundreds of millions of euros" if legally sold at an auction. However, the paintings had been registered as stolen in their database.

The alleged thieves were arrested in Romania in July 2013. They reportedly met on Tinder. It is unclear what happened to the paintings: Olga Dogaru, whose son, Radu, has confessed to his involvement in the theft, initially claimed that she had burned them all in an effort to protect him; however, she subsequently denied this in a court hearing. However, investigators found pigments and nails of the correct age for the stolen paintings in her fireplace. Authorities believed that Olga burned the stolen paintings to protect her son and the other thieves.

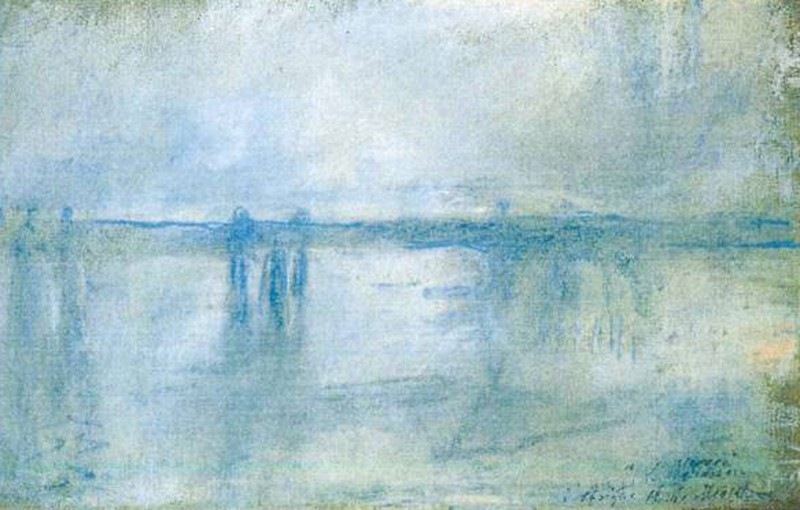
Charing Cross Bridge, London by Claude Monet (1901). Triton

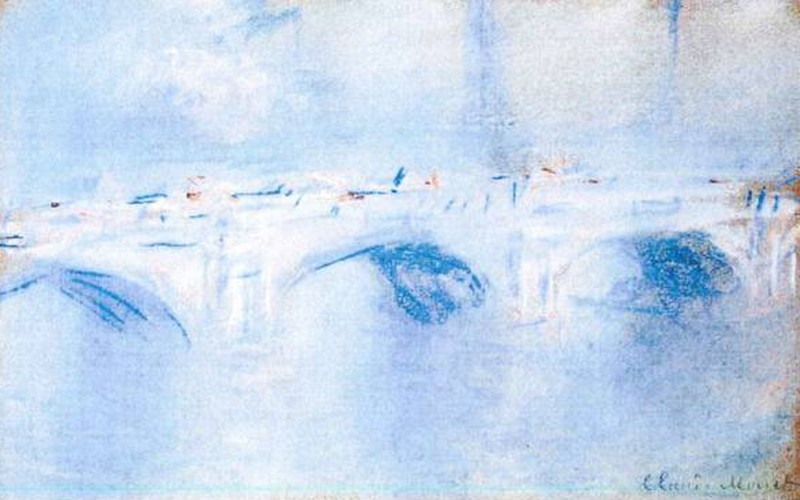
Waterloo Bridge, London by Claude Monet (1901). Triton

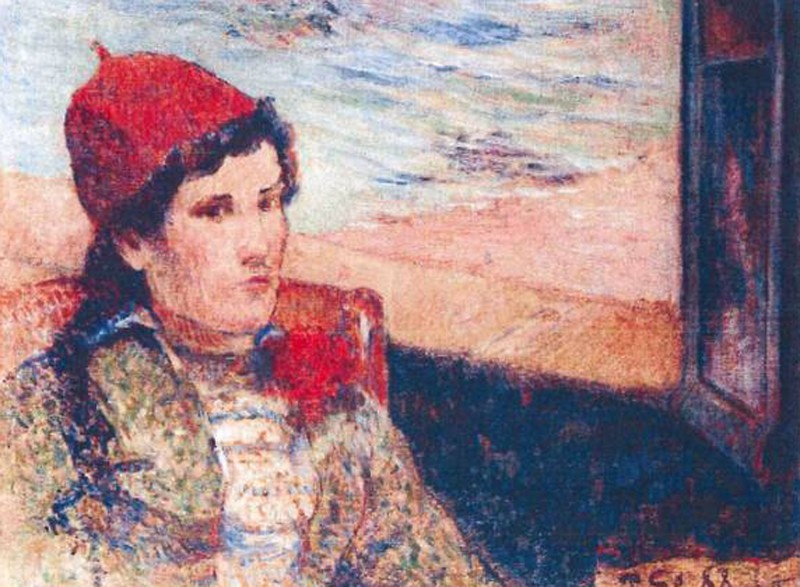
Femme devant une fenêtre ouverte, dite la Fiancée by Paul Gauguin (1888). Triton

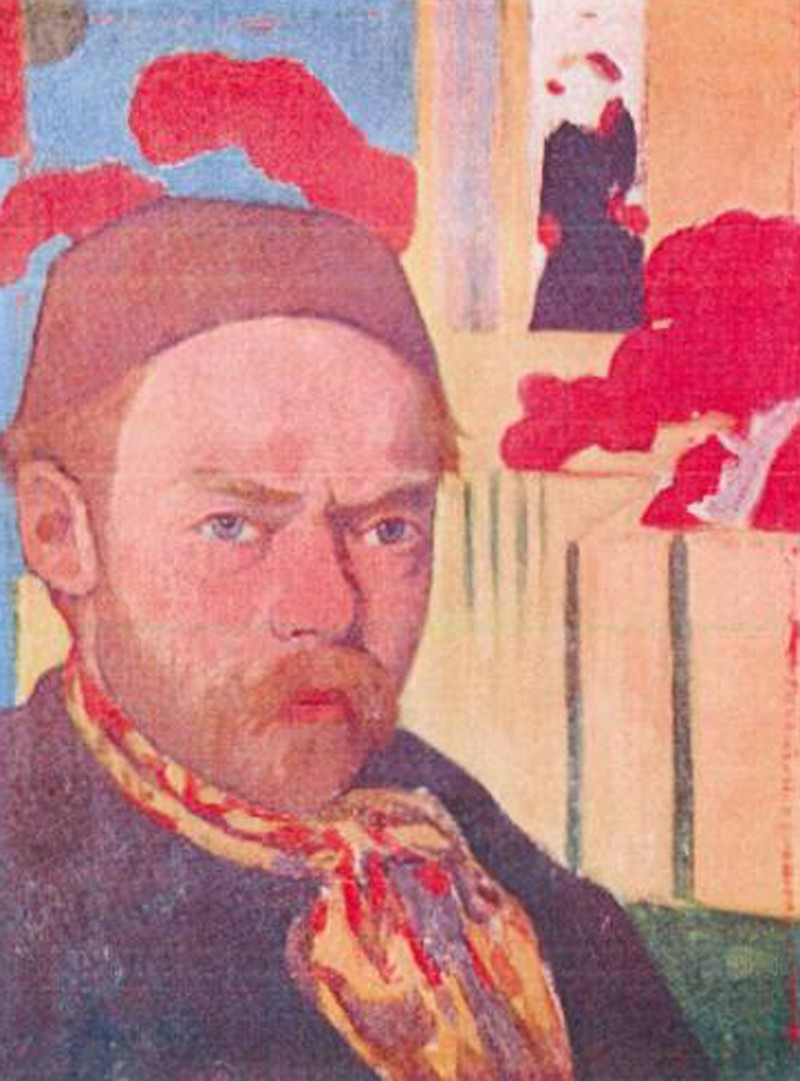
Autoportrait by Jacob Meijer de Haan (circa 1889 – ’91). Triton
