= Waterloo Bridge (Monet series) =

1900–1903 series of paintings by Claude Monet

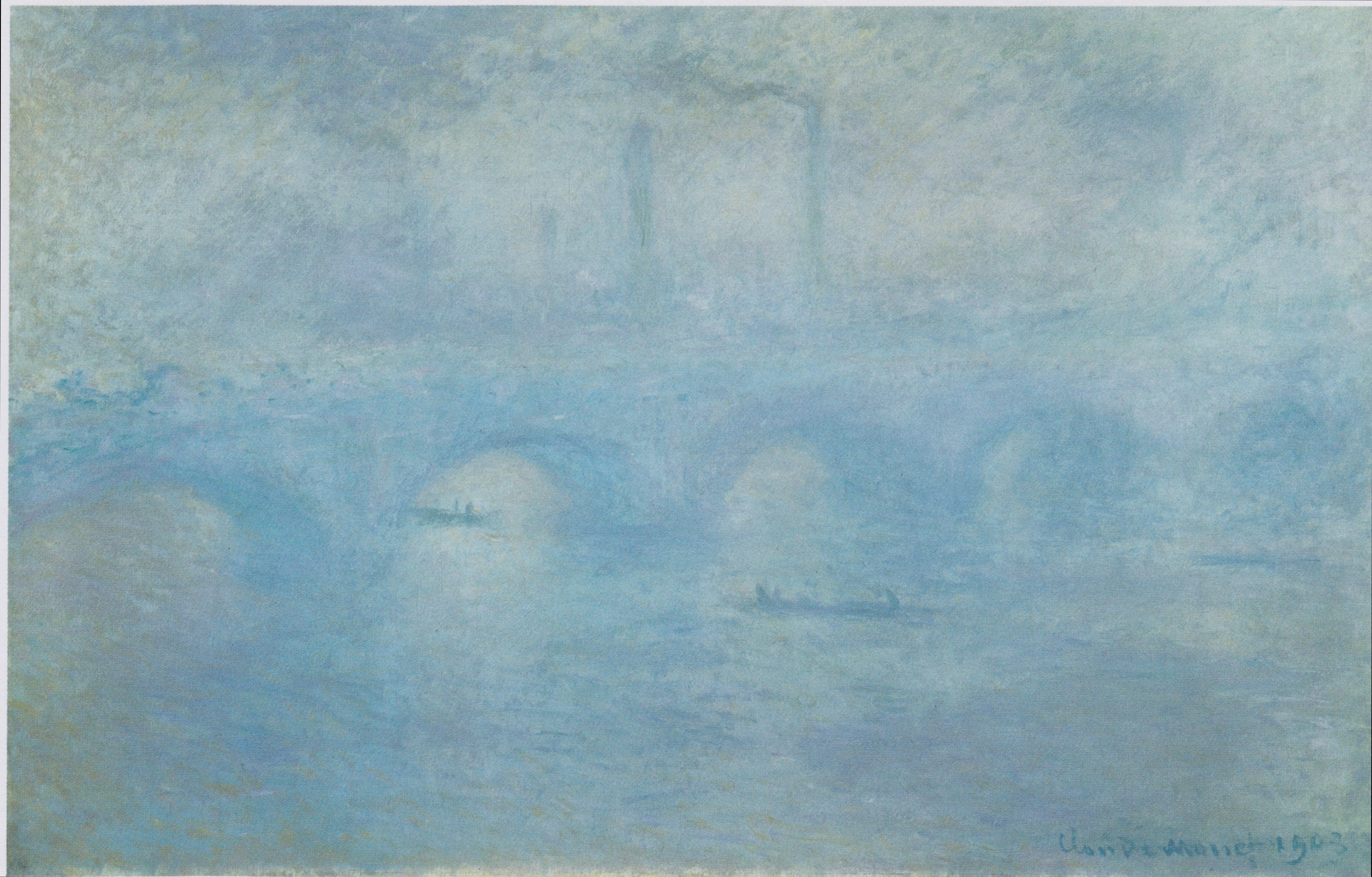
Hermitage version (Waterloo Bridge. Effect of Fog)

Waterloo Bridge is a series of 41 impressionist oil paintings of the 1807–1810 Waterloo Bridge in London by Claude Monet, produced between 1900 and 1904 and forming a sub-series within his larger 'London series' alongside the Charing Cross Bridge series and the Houses of Parliament series.

== Context ==
Under exile during the Franco-Prussian War, Monet travelled to London for the first time in 1870. Monet became enthralled with the city, and vowed to return to it someday. His fascination with London lay primarily in its fogs, a by-product of the Industrial Revolution. But writers hypothesise that Monet was also inspired by contemporaries J. M. W. Turner and James Abbott McNeill Whistler, who were similarly mesmerised by London's atmosphere and atmospheric effects. In 1899 Monet returned to London and rented a room in the Savoy Hotel, which offered an extensive viewpoint from which to begin his series of the city.

Between 1899 and 1905, Monet periodically travelled to London to work on paintings. He repeatedly painted the Waterloo Bridge and created other paintings of the city's sights, including the Houses of Parliament series and Charing Cross Bridge series. While Monet began all of the paintings in London, he completed many of them in his studio in Giverny.

== Selected works ==
Image	Title	Date	Dimensions (cm)	Collection
	Waterloo Bridge (W1555)	1900	65 x 93	Santa Barbara Museum of Art
	Waterloo Bridge, London	1900	65 x 100	Hugh Lane Municipal Gallery, Dublin
	Waterloo Bridge in London	1901		Stolen from the Kunsthal in Rotterdam, burnt by the mother of the thief to destroy the evidence.
	Waterloo Bridge in London (W1594)	1902	66 x 100	National Museum of Western Art (Tokyo)
	Waterloo Bridge	1903	86 x 121	Denver Art Museum
	Waterloo Bridge. Effect of Fog.	1903	65 x 101	Hermitage Museum, Saint Petersburg
	Waterloo Bridge by Twilight	1903		National Gallery of Art, Washington, D.C.
	Waterloo Bridge, Gray Day	1903		National Gallery of Art, Washington, D.C.
	Waterloo Bridge, Sun Through Fog	1903	74 x 100	National Gallery of Canada, Ottawa
	Waterloo Bridge, Cloudy Weather	1903	65 x 100	Ordrupgaard, Copenhagen
	Waterloo Bridge, Sun	1903	65 x 100	McMaster Museum of Art, Hamilton, Ontario
	Waterloo Bridge, Veiled Sun	1903	65 x 100	Memorial Art Gallery, Rochester, New York
	Waterloo Bridge by Twilight	1904		Private collection

== See also ==
- List of paintings by Claude Monet
