= Houses of Parliament (Monet series) =

1899–1901 series of paintings by Claude Monet

Claude Monet painted several series of nearly 100 impressionist oil paintings of different views of the Thames River in the autumn of 1899 and the early months of 1900 and 1901 during stays in London. One of these series consists of views of the Palace of Westminster, home of the British Parliament, and he began the first of these paintings at about 15.45 on 13 February 1900. All of the series' paintings share the same viewpoint from Monet's window or a terrace at St Thomas' Hospital overlooking the Thames and the approximate canvas size of 81 cm × 92 cm (32 in × 36 3/8 in). They are, however, painted during different times of the day and weather conditions.

By the time of the Houses of Parliament series, Monet had abandoned his earlier practice of completing a painting on the spot in front of the motif. He carried on refining the images back home in Giverny, France, and sent to London for photographs to help in this. This caused some adverse reaction, but Monet's reply was that his means of creating a work was his own business and it was up to the viewer to judge the final result.

== Gallery ==
Some of the 19 known paintings in the Houses of Parliament series:

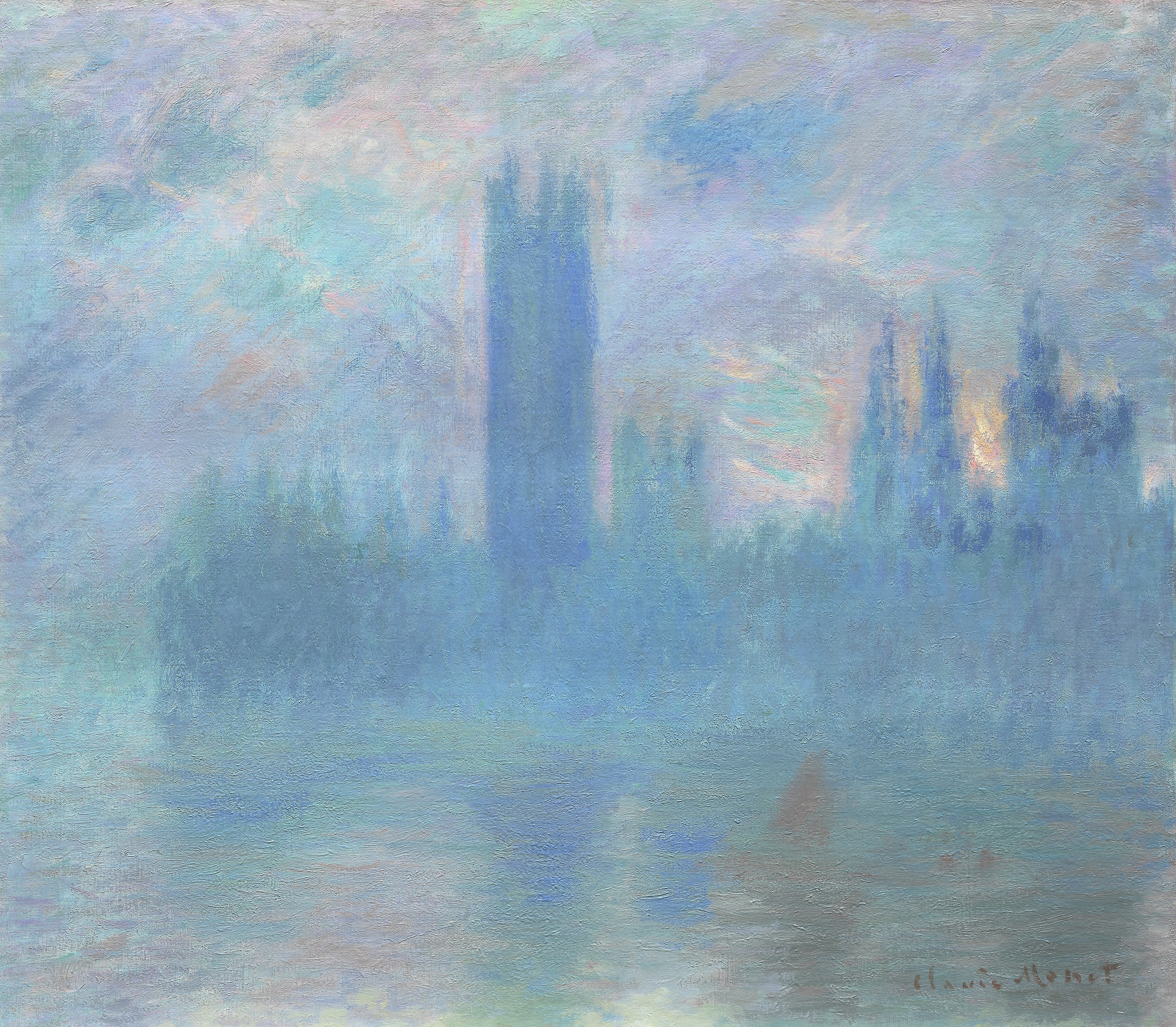
Houses of Parliament, London, 1900–1901 The Art Institute of Chicago

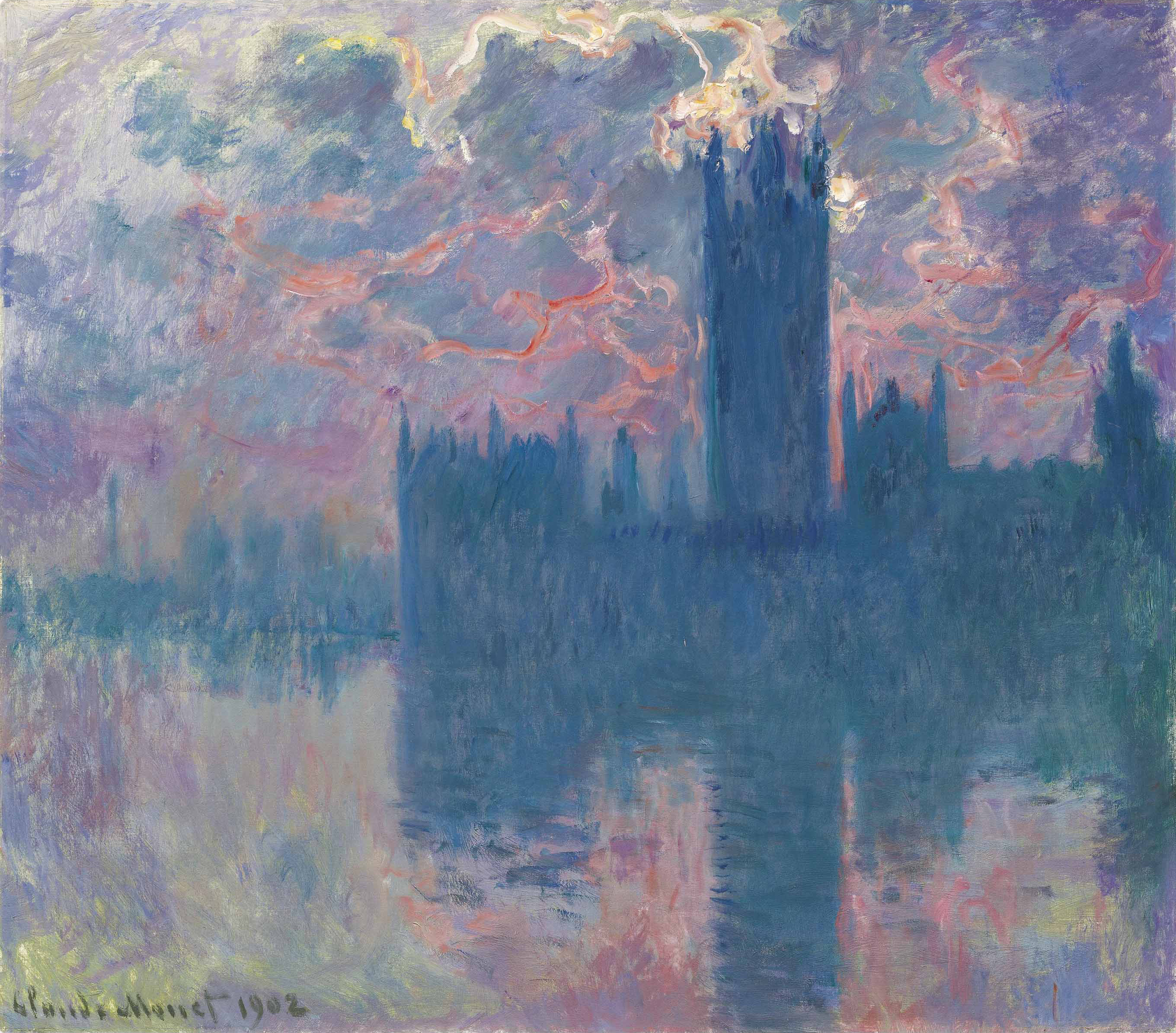
Parlement, coucher du soleil (sunset), 1902, private collection

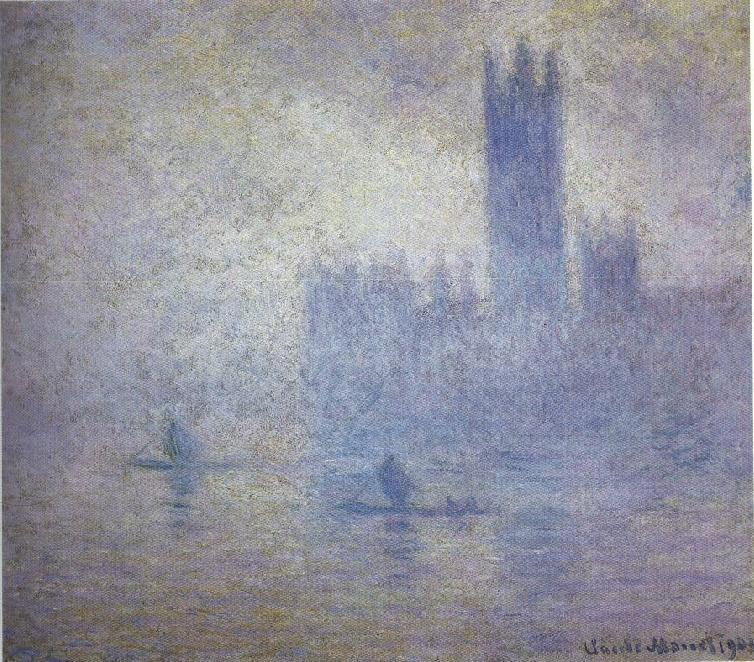
Le Parlement, Effet de Brouillard, 1903, Museum of Fine Arts (St. Petersburg, Florida)

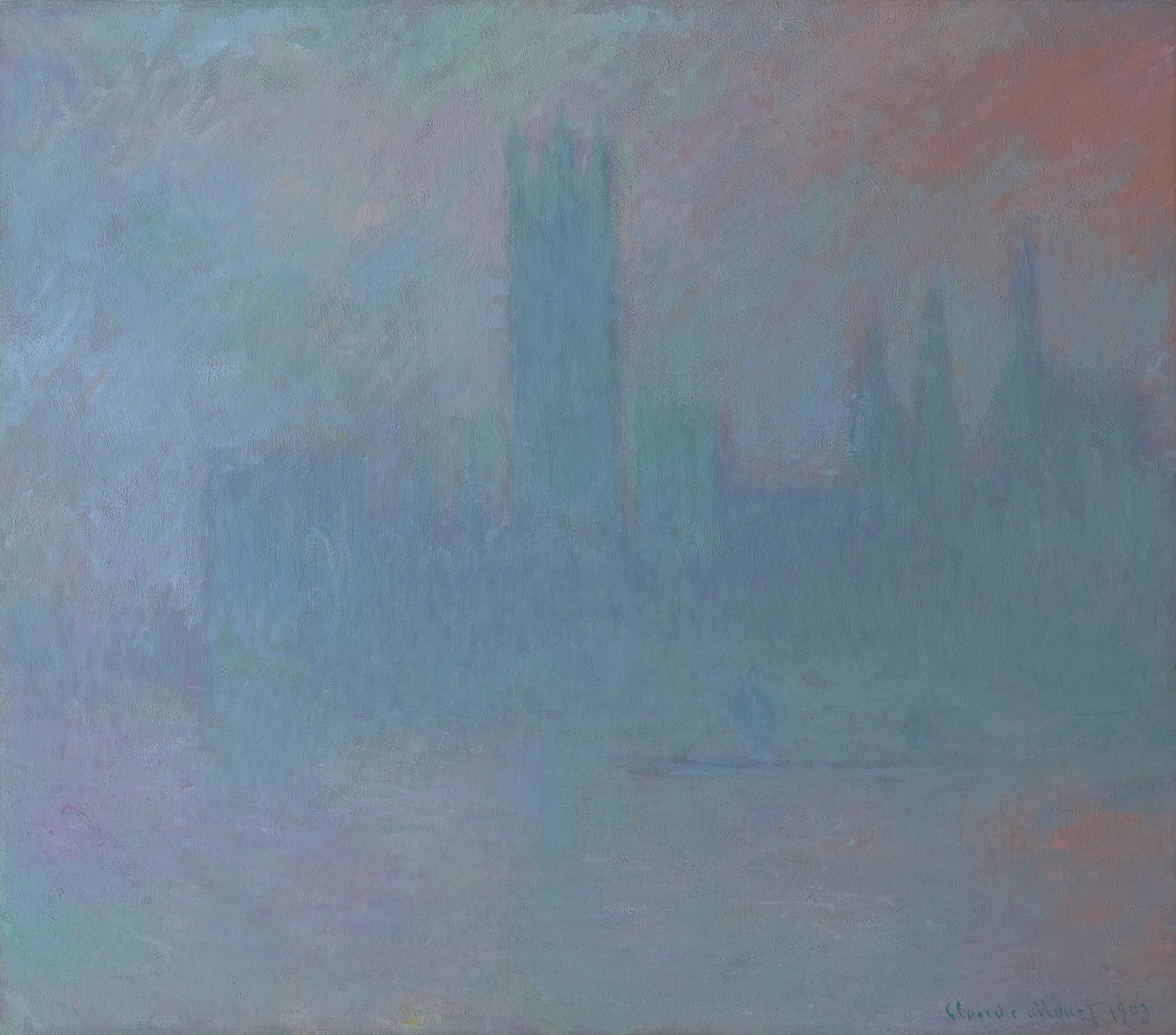
Houses of Parliament in the Fog, 1903, High Museum of Art

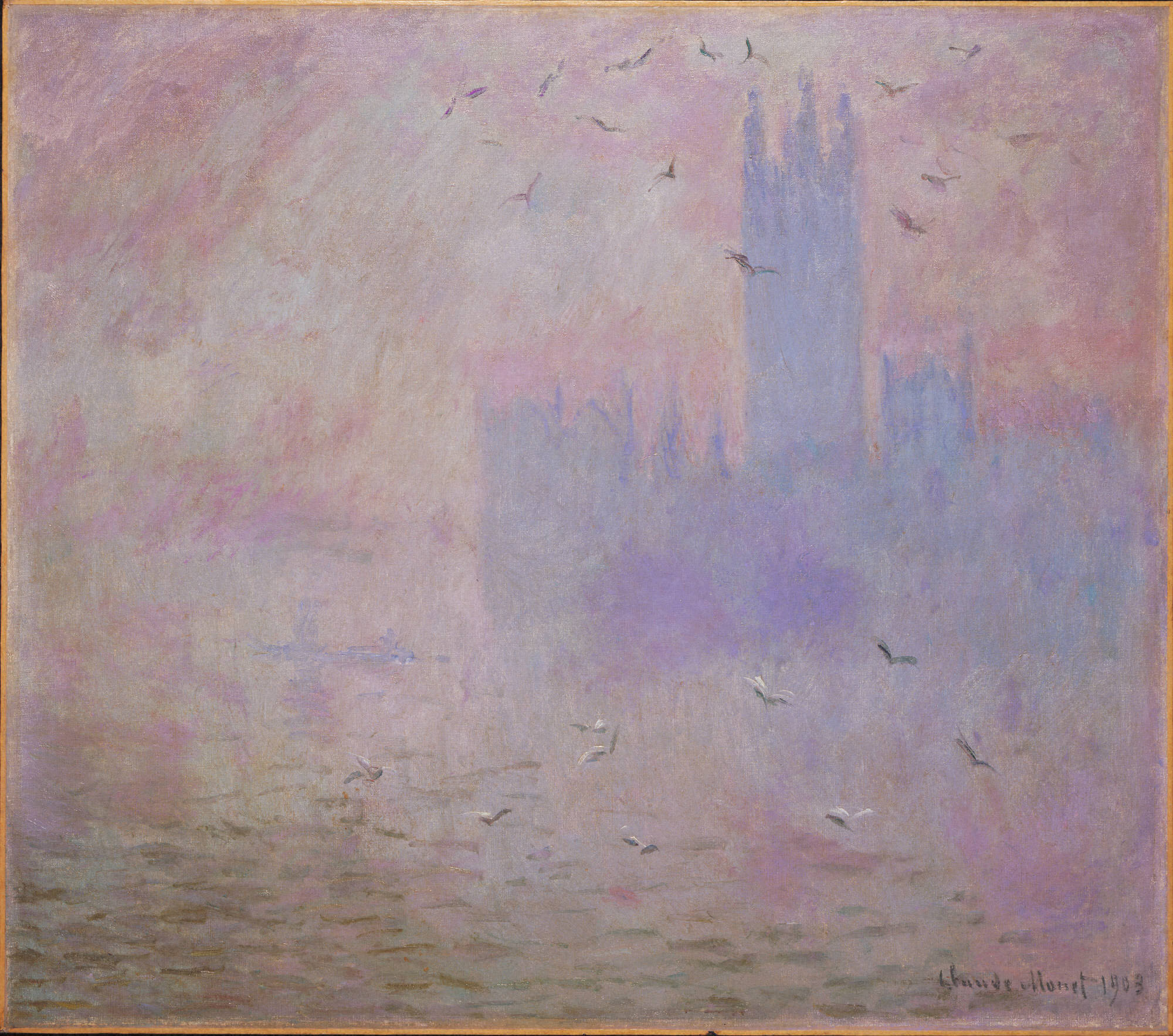
The Houses of Parliament, Seagulls, 1903, Princeton University Art Museum

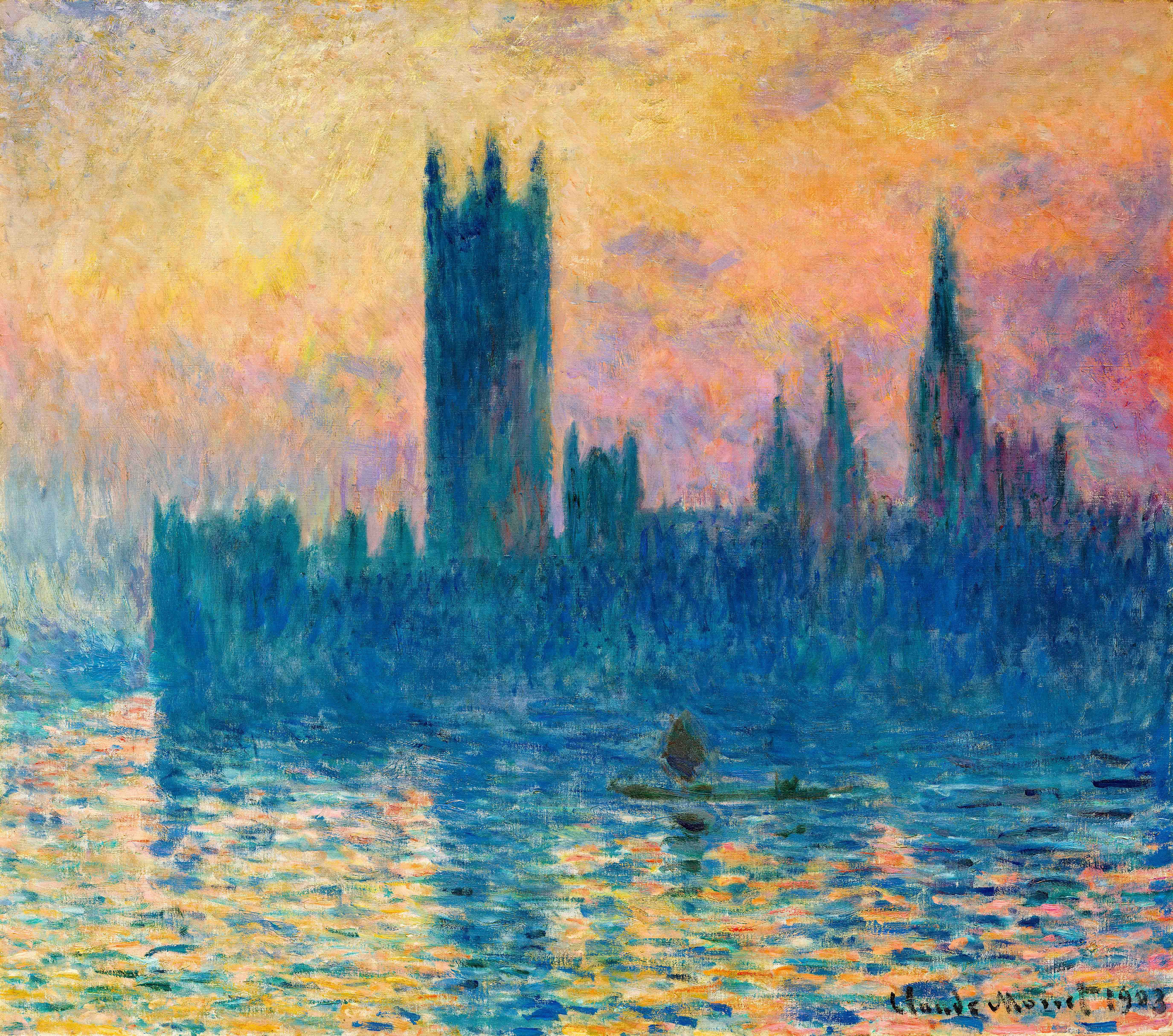
The Houses of Parliament, Sunset, 1903, National Gallery of Art Washington, DC.

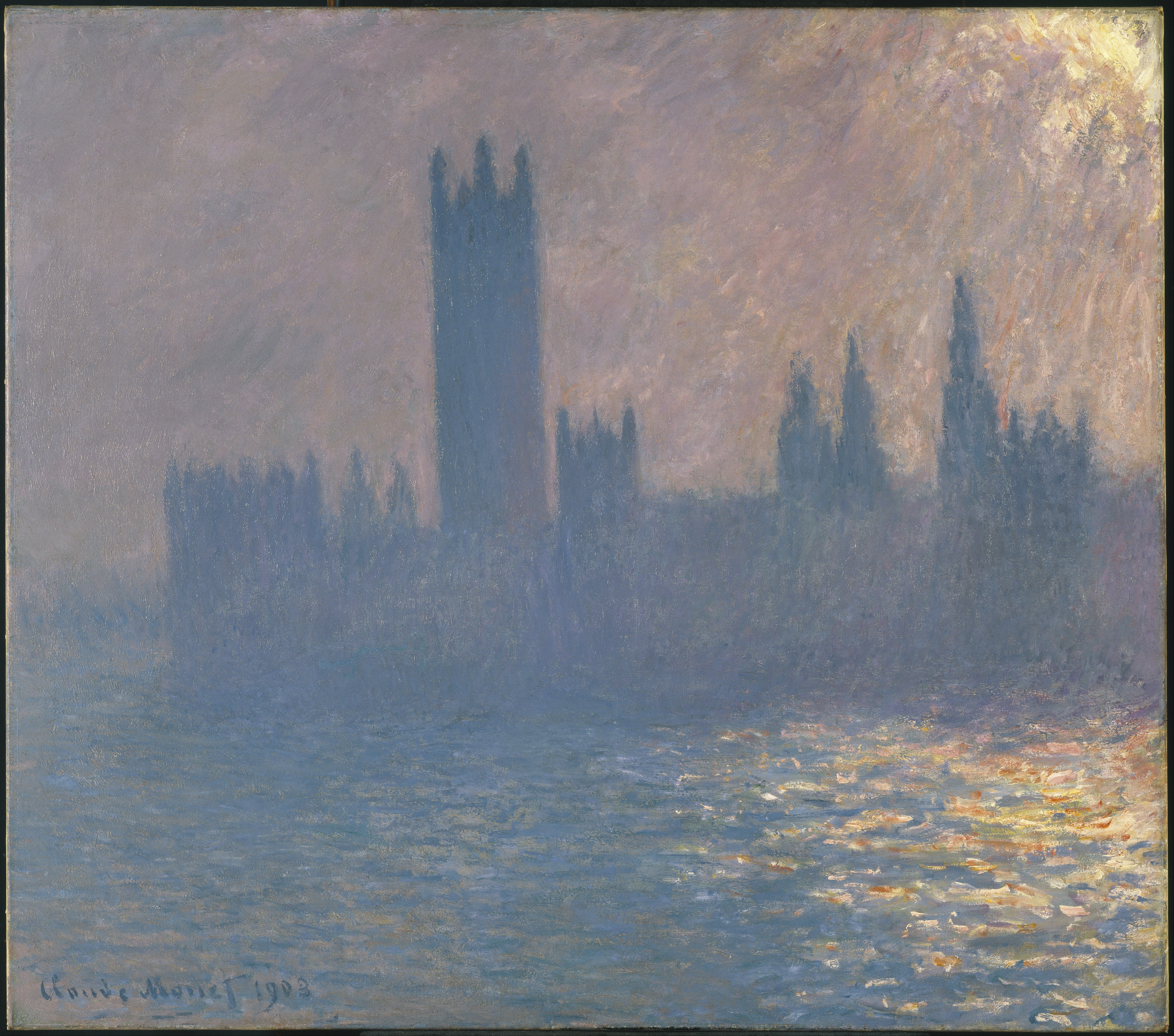
Houses of Parliament Sunlight Effect (Le Parlement effet de soleil), 1903, Brooklyn Museum

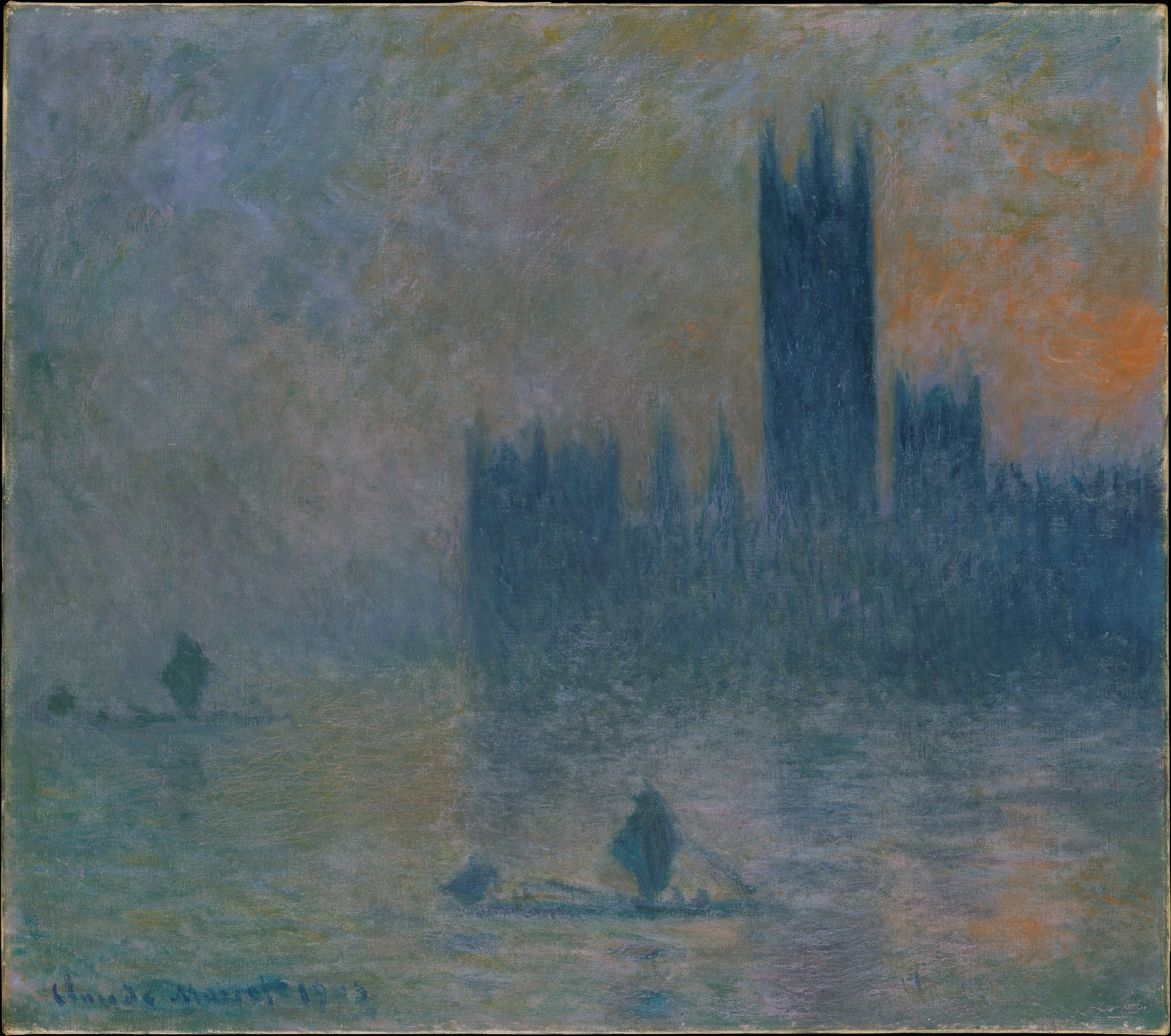
The Houses of Parliament (Effect of Fog), 1903–1904, Metropolitan Museum of Art

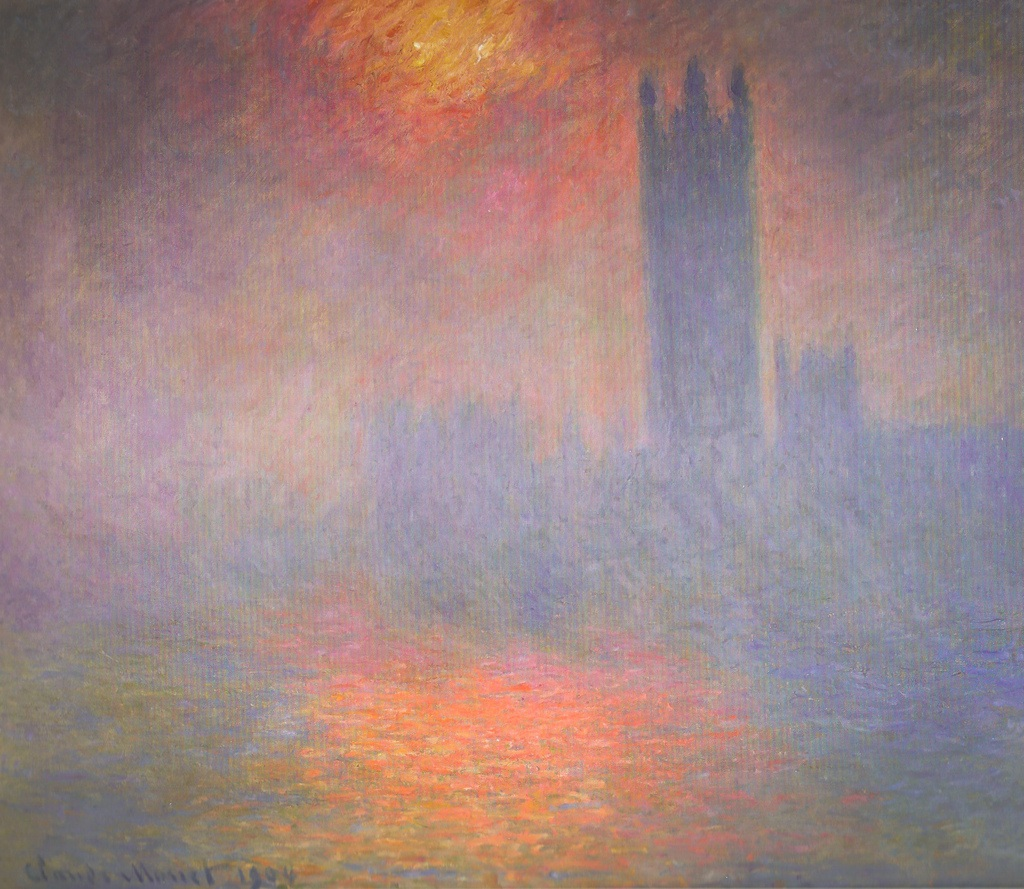
Trouée de soleil dans le brouillard (Sun Breaking Through the Fog) Houses of Parliament, 1904. London, Sun Breaking Through the Fog, 1904 Musée d'Orsay, Paris

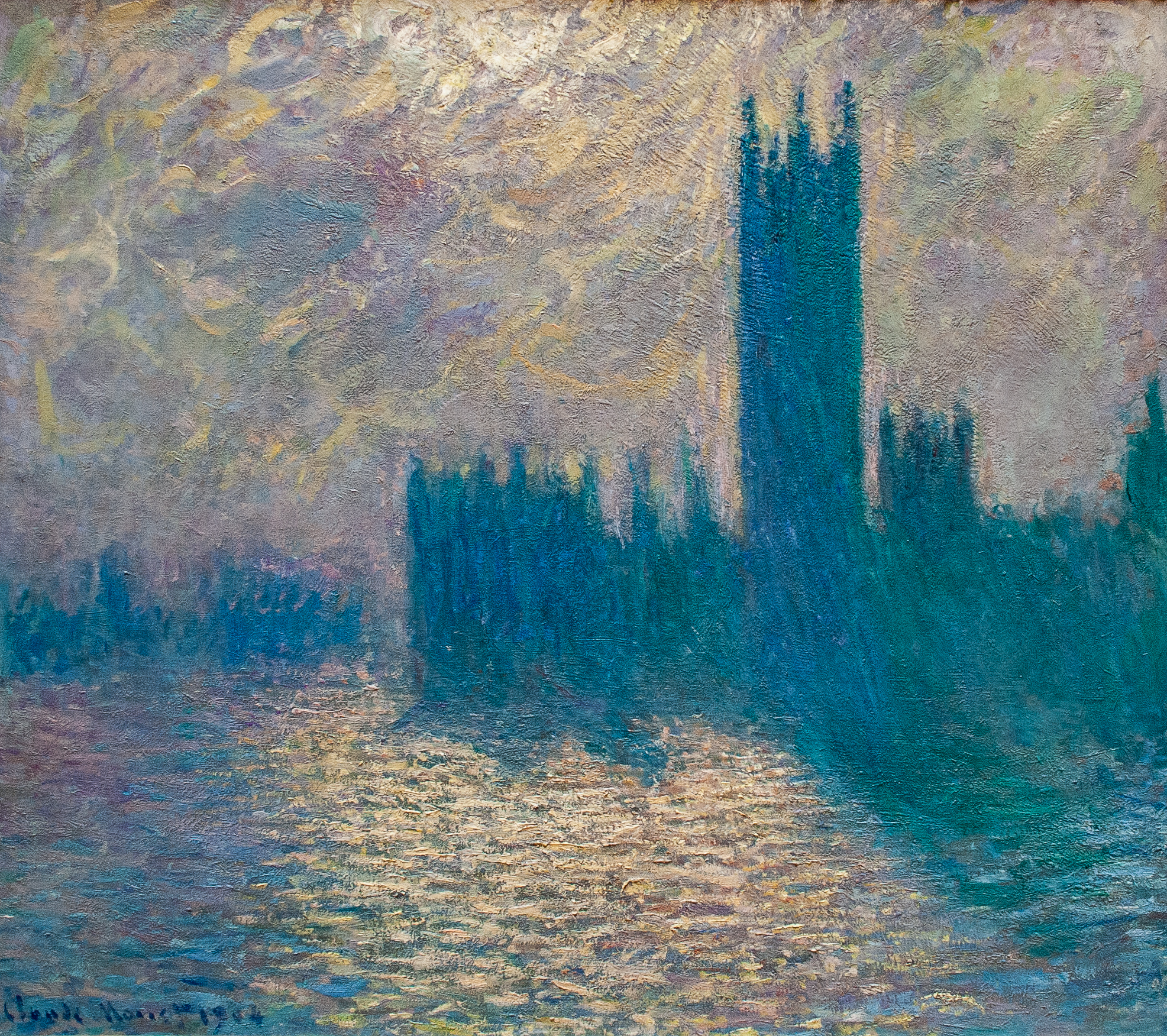
Houses of Parliament, stormy sky, 1904, Palais des Beaux-Arts de Lille, Lille, France

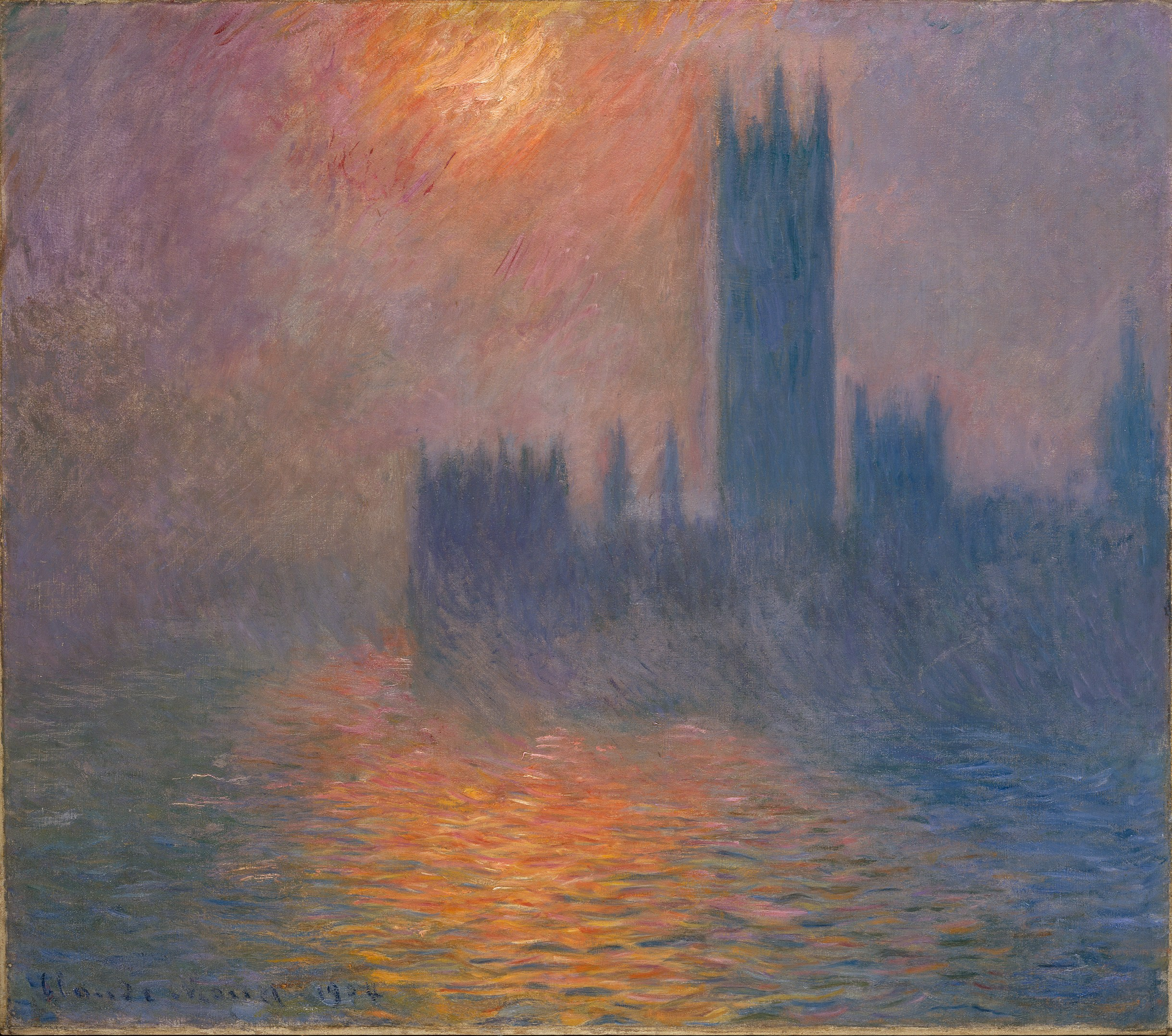
Houses of Parliament, London, ca. 1904, Kunsthaus Zürich

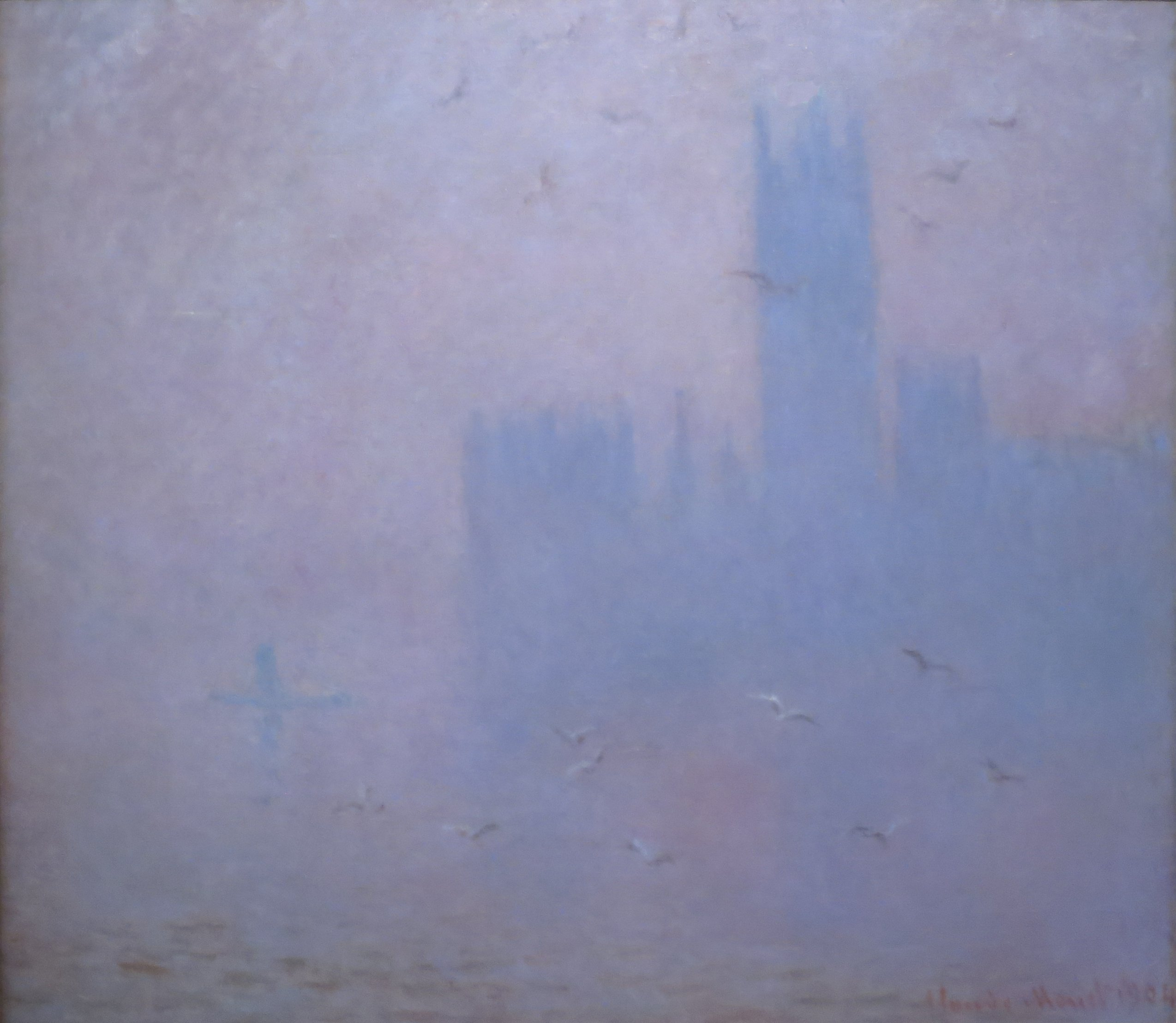
Seagulls, the River Thames and the Houses of Parliament, 1904, Pushkin Museum

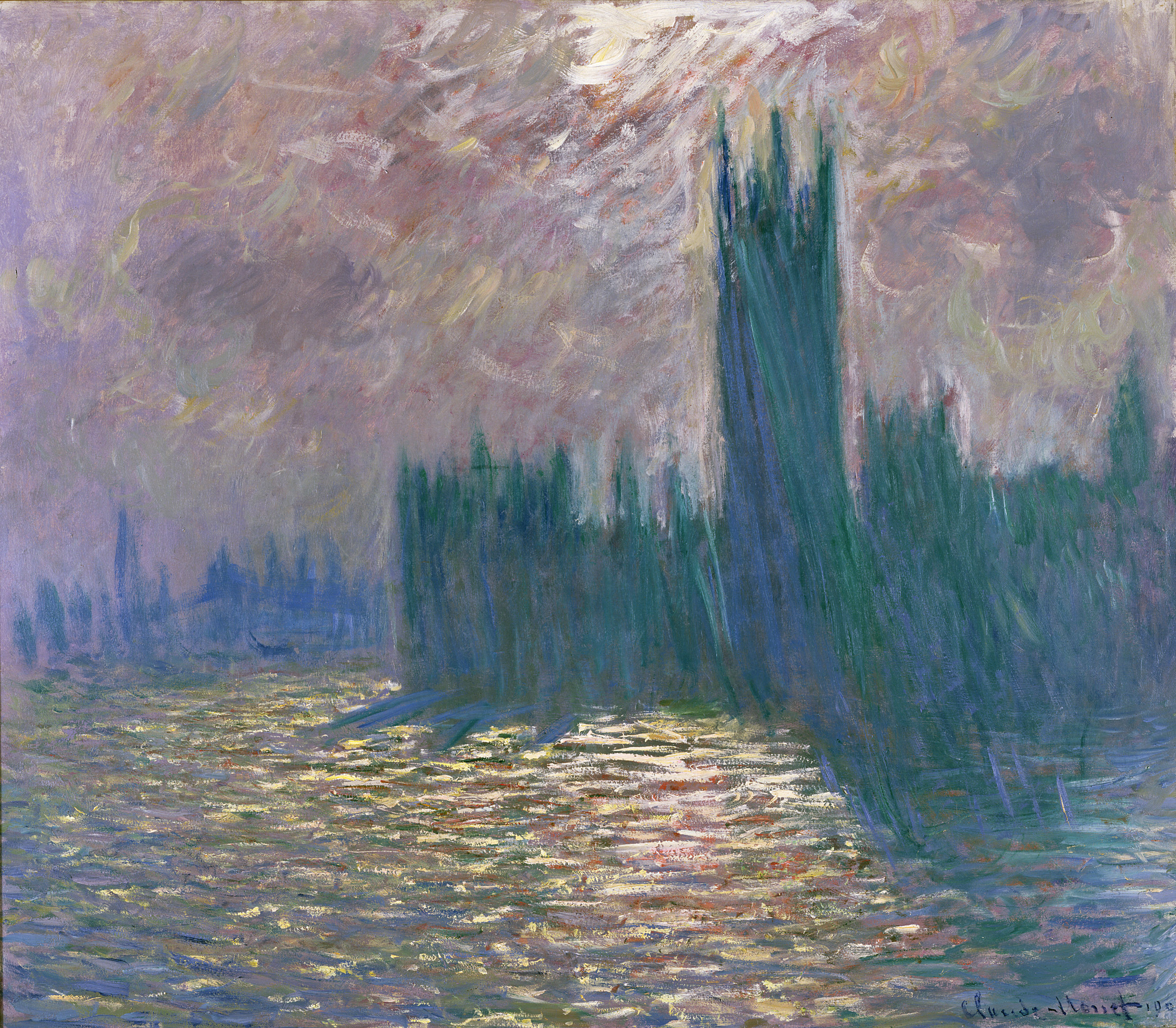
Houses of Parliament, London, Musée Marmottan Monet, 1905

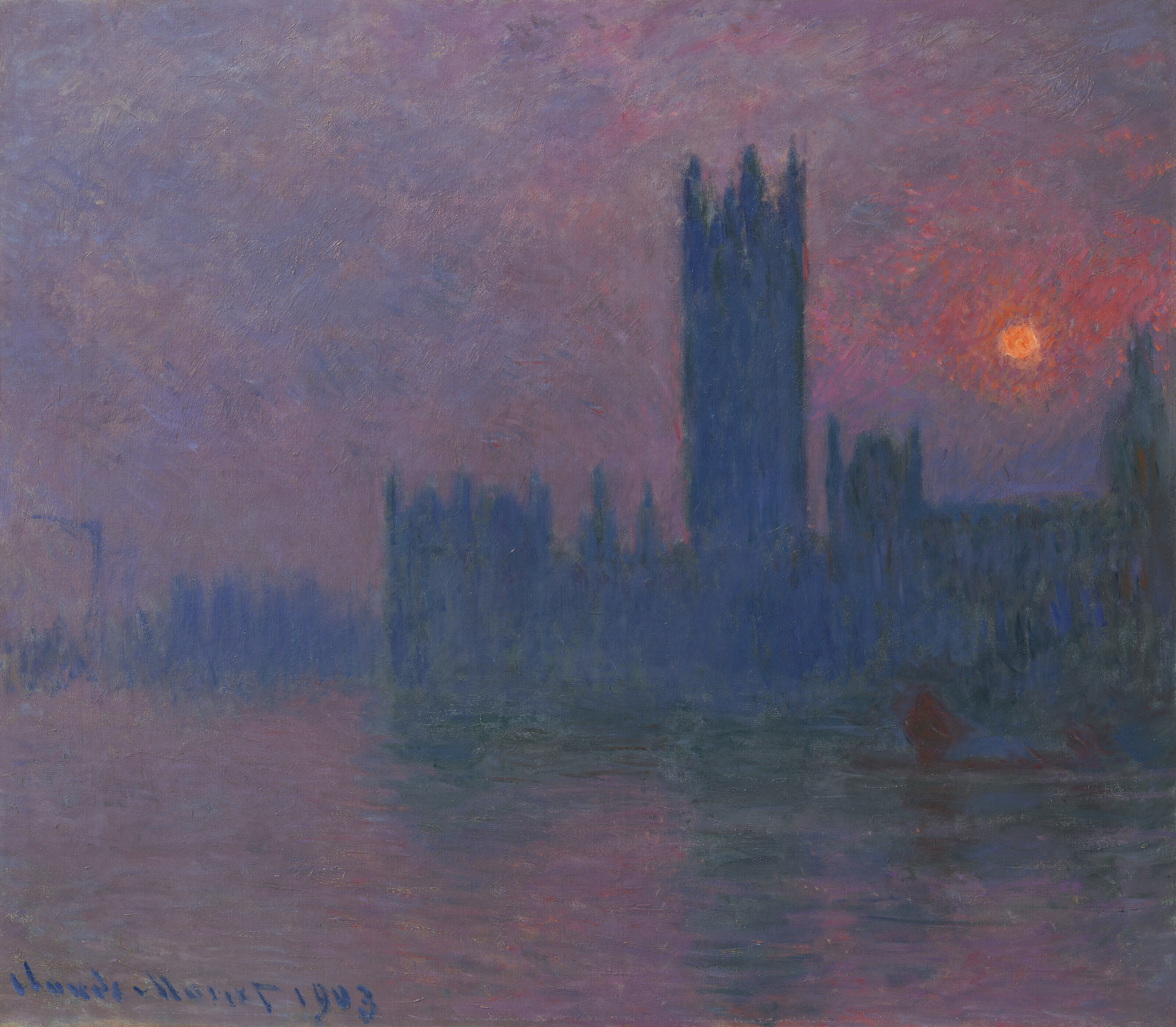
Le Parlement, soleil couchant (Houses of Parliament, Sunset), 1900-1903, Hasso Plattner Collection

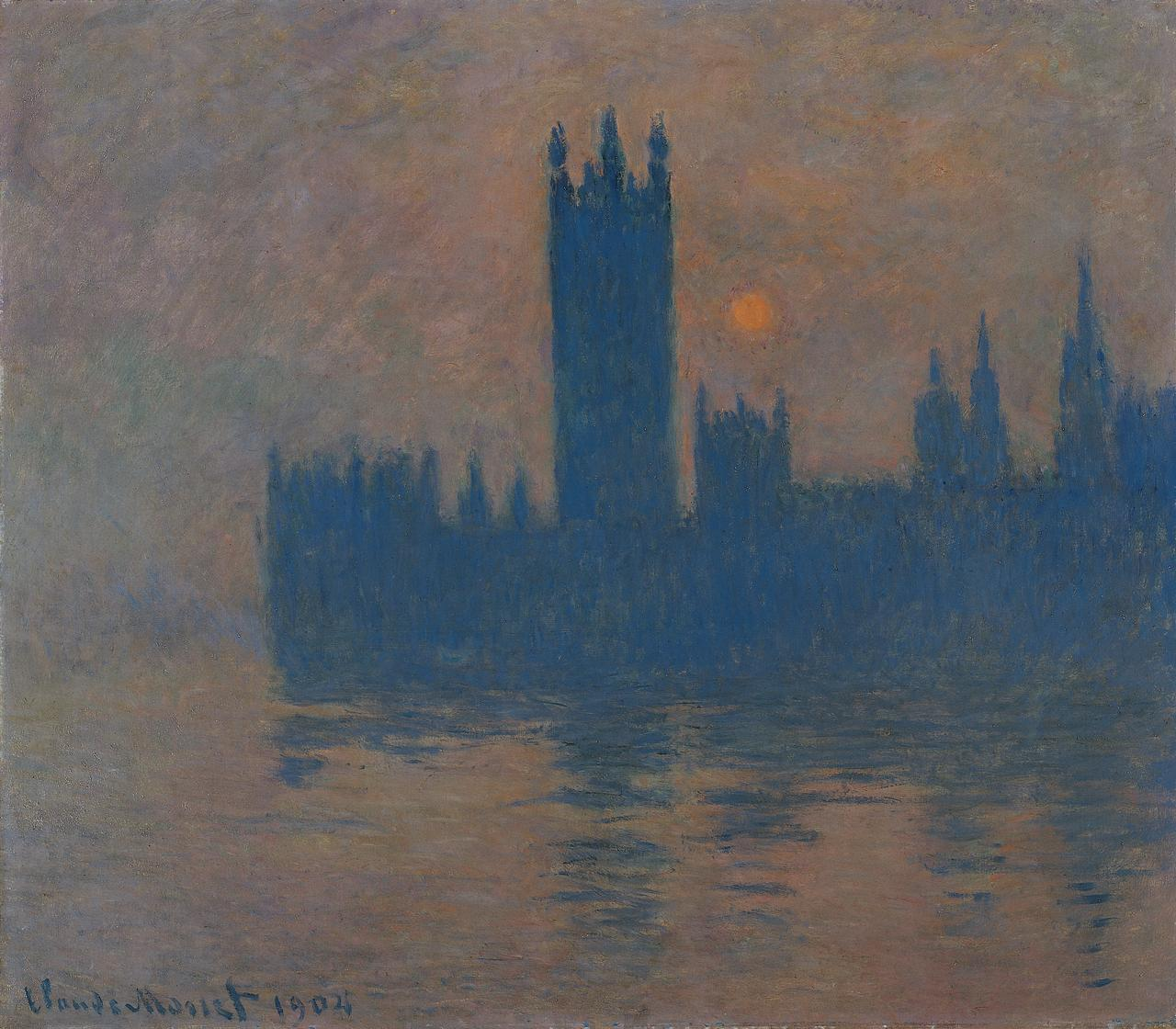
Houses of Parliament, London, Kunstmuseen Krefeld, 1904

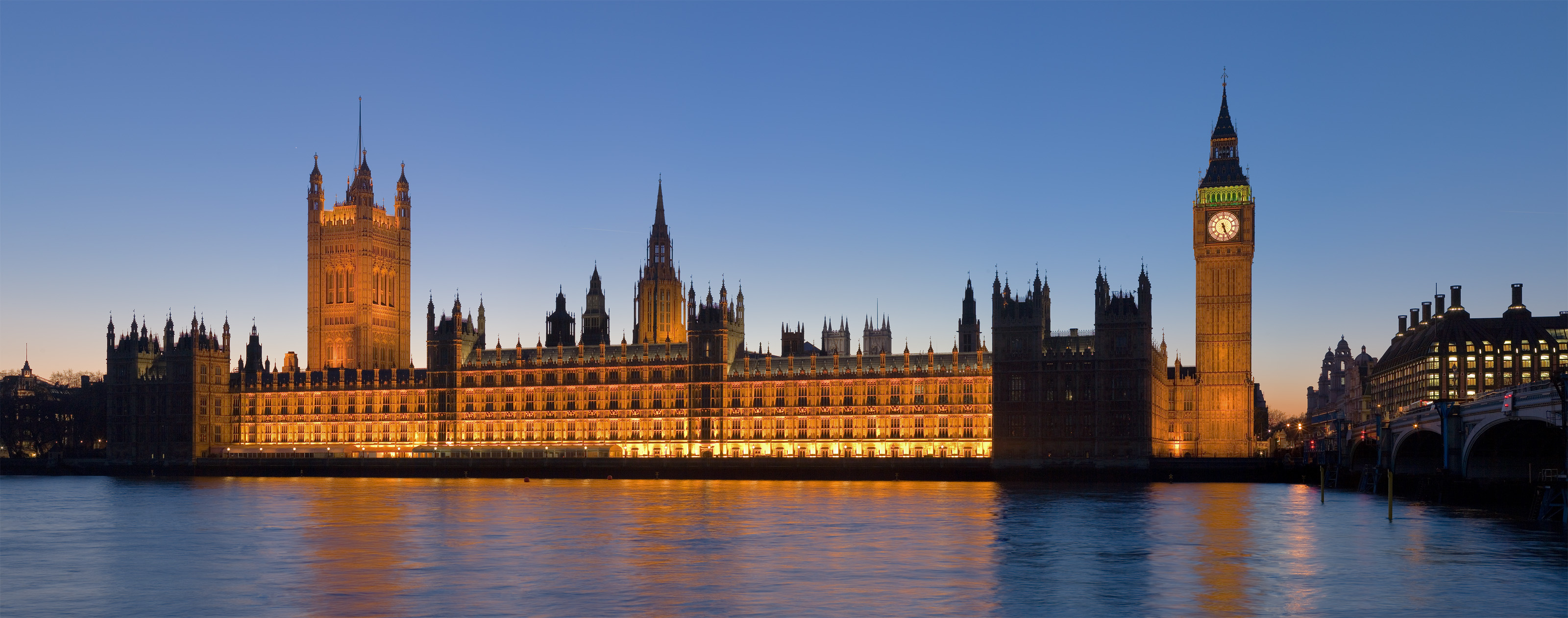
Modern view of the Houses of Parliament at dusk in an approximately identical angle. The paintings were framed to exclusively depict the leftmost half of the building, with Victoria Tower as the focal point.

== Context ==
The Burning of the Houses of Lords and Commons, Cleveland Museum of Art, 92 cm (36.2 in) x 123 cm (48.4 in). This painting by J. M. W. Turner depicts the Houses of Parliament as seen from near Waterloo Bridge. Monet painted series of paintings of each of these structures after he gained an "enthusiastic admiration" of Turner's work during the late 1880s.

Under exile during the Franco-Prussian War, Monet travelled to London for the first time in 1870. Monet became enthralled with the city, and vowed to return to it someday. Monet's fascination with London lay primarily in its fogs, a byproduct of the Industrial Revolution. But writers hypothesize that Monet was also inspired by contemporaries J. M. W. Turner and James Abbott McNeill Whistler, who were similarly fascinated by London's atmosphere and atmospheric effects in general. Thus, in 1899, Monet returned to London and rented a room in the Savoy Hotel, which offered an extensive viewpoint from which to begin his series of the city.

Between 1899 and 1905 Monet periodically travelled to London to paint. In addition to the Houses of Parliament paintings, Monet created other paintings of the city's sights, including the Charing Cross Bridge series and Waterloo Bridge series. While Monet began all of the paintings in London, he completed many of them in his studio in Giverny. As a result, some critics question whether the paintings are completely accurate. On the other hand, analyses of solar positioning reported in 2006 show that Monet's paintings "contain elements of accurate observation and may potentially be considered as a proxy indicator for the Victorian smogs and atmospheric states they depict." A 2023 study shows that "stylistic changes from more figurative to impressionistic paintings by Turner and Monet over the 19th century strongly covary with increasing levels of air pollution. In particular, stylistic changes in their work toward hazier contours and a whiter color palette are consistent with the optical changes expected from higher atmospheric aerosol concentrations. These results indicate that Turner and Monet’s paintings capture elements of the atmospheric environmental transformation during the Industrial Revolution."

== Public display ==
=== Impressionists in London ===
In 2018 the Tate Britain in London exhibited six paintings of the series, together in a single room, for the duration of a temporary exhibition titled Impressionists in London, French artists in exile (1870–1904), devoted to the temporary exile of French and impressionist artists in London during the Franco-Prussian War. This was a rare occurrence because no museum owns or exhibits more than two in a permanent collection.

The paintings were also shown at the Petit Palais when the temporary exhibition travelled from London to Paris.

The six paintings were the examples from the following collections:

- Art Institute of Chicago
- Brooklyn Museum
- Kaiser Wilhelm Museum
- Metropolitan Museum of Art
- Musée d'Orsay
- Museum of modern art André Malraux - MuMa

=== Monet & Architecture ===
Again in 2018 the National Gallery in London exhibited three paintings of the series, together in a single room, for the duration of a temporary exhibition titled Monet & Architecture, devoted to Claude Monet's use of architecture as a means to structure and enliven his art. This was a rare occurrence because no museum owns or exhibits more than two in a permanent collection.

The three paintings exhibited were the examples from the following collections:

- Museum of Fine Arts, St. Petersburg
- Kunsthaus Zürich
- Palais des Beaux-Arts de Lille

== See also ==
- List of paintings by Claude Monet
