= Charing Cross Bridge (Monet series) =

1899–1905 painting series by Claude Monet

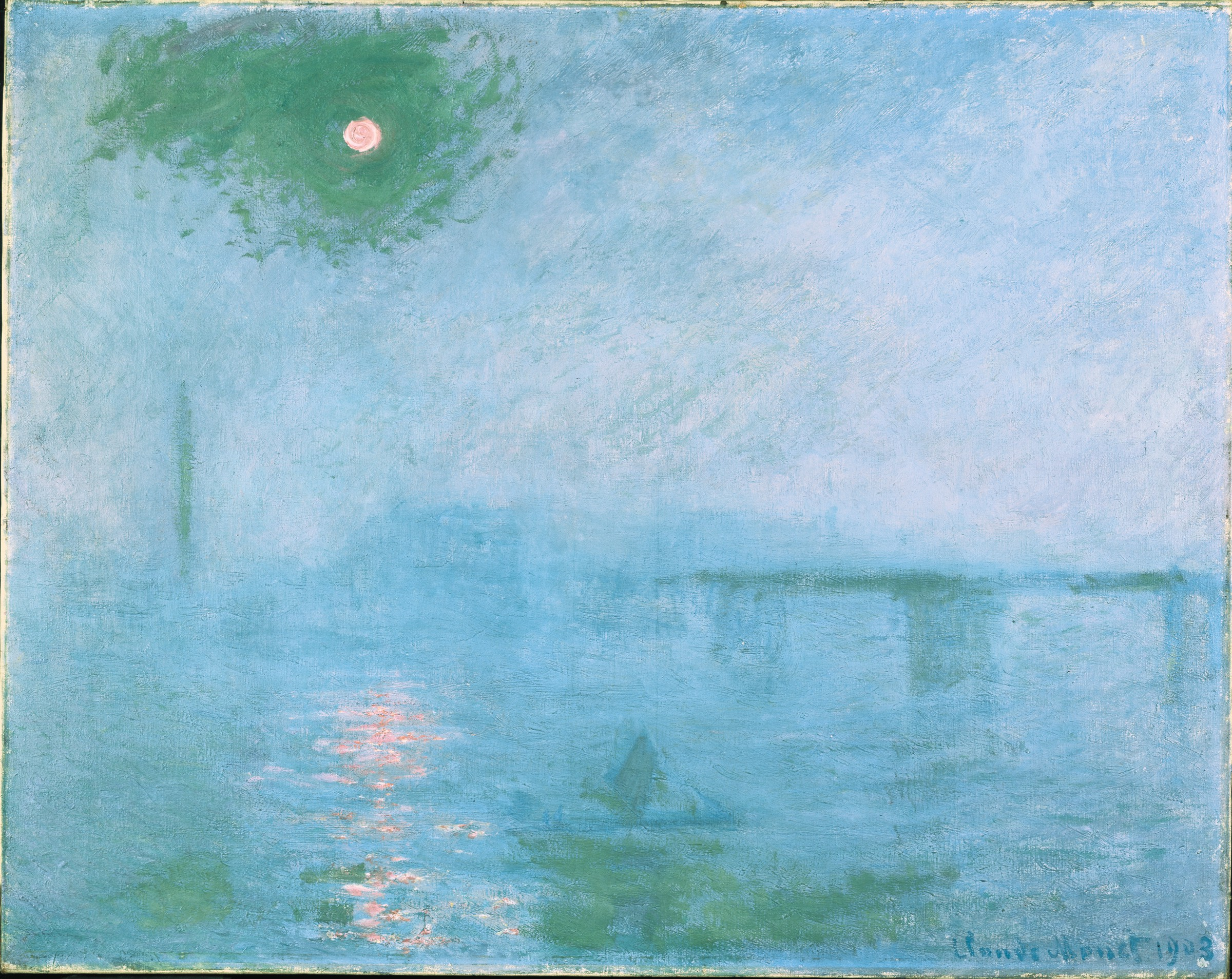
- Charing Cross Bridge: Fog on the Thames
- Artist: Claude Monet
- Year: 1903
- Medium: Oil on canvas

Charing Cross Bridge is a series of oil paintings by French artist Claude Monet. The paintings depict a misty, impressionist Charing Cross Bridge in London, England. Monet worked on the series from 1899 to 1905, creating a total of 34 paintings depicting the bridge.

While all of the paintings in the series depict the same bridge, each has unique qualities. For instance, Monet uses different color combinations to portray different atmospheric conditions. In some paintings, Monet includes details such as trains, clock towers, and boats, but omits such features in others.

Today, the Charing Cross Bridge paintings are scattered in museums around the world. These include the Art Institute of Chicago, the Baltimore Museum of Art, the Museum of Fine Arts, Boston, the Art Gallery of Ontario and the Thyssen-Bornemisza Museum in Madrid.

== Context ==
Under exile during the Franco-Prussian War, Monet travelled to London for the first time in 1870. He became enthralled with the city and vowed to return to it someday. Monet's fascination with London lay primarily in its fogs, a byproduct of the Industrial Revolution. Writers hypothesize that Monet was also inspired by contemporaries J. M. W. Turner and James Abbott McNeill Whistler, who were similarly fascinated by London's atmosphere. Thus, in 1899, Monet returned to London and rented a room in the Savoy Hotel, which offered an extensive viewpoint from which to begin his series of the city.

Between 1899 and 1905, Monet periodically travelled to London to work on the series. He completed 34 paintings of the Charing Cross Bridge in total. In addition to painting the bridge, Monet painted other landmarks, such as the Houses of Parliament and Waterloo Bridge. While Monet began all of the paintings in London, he completed many of them in his studio in Giverny, France. As a result, some critics question whether the paintings are completely accurate. On the other hand, recent analyses of solar positioning report that Monet's paintings "contain elements of accurate observation and may potentially be considered as a proxy indicator for the Victorian smogs and atmospheric states they depict."

== Description ==
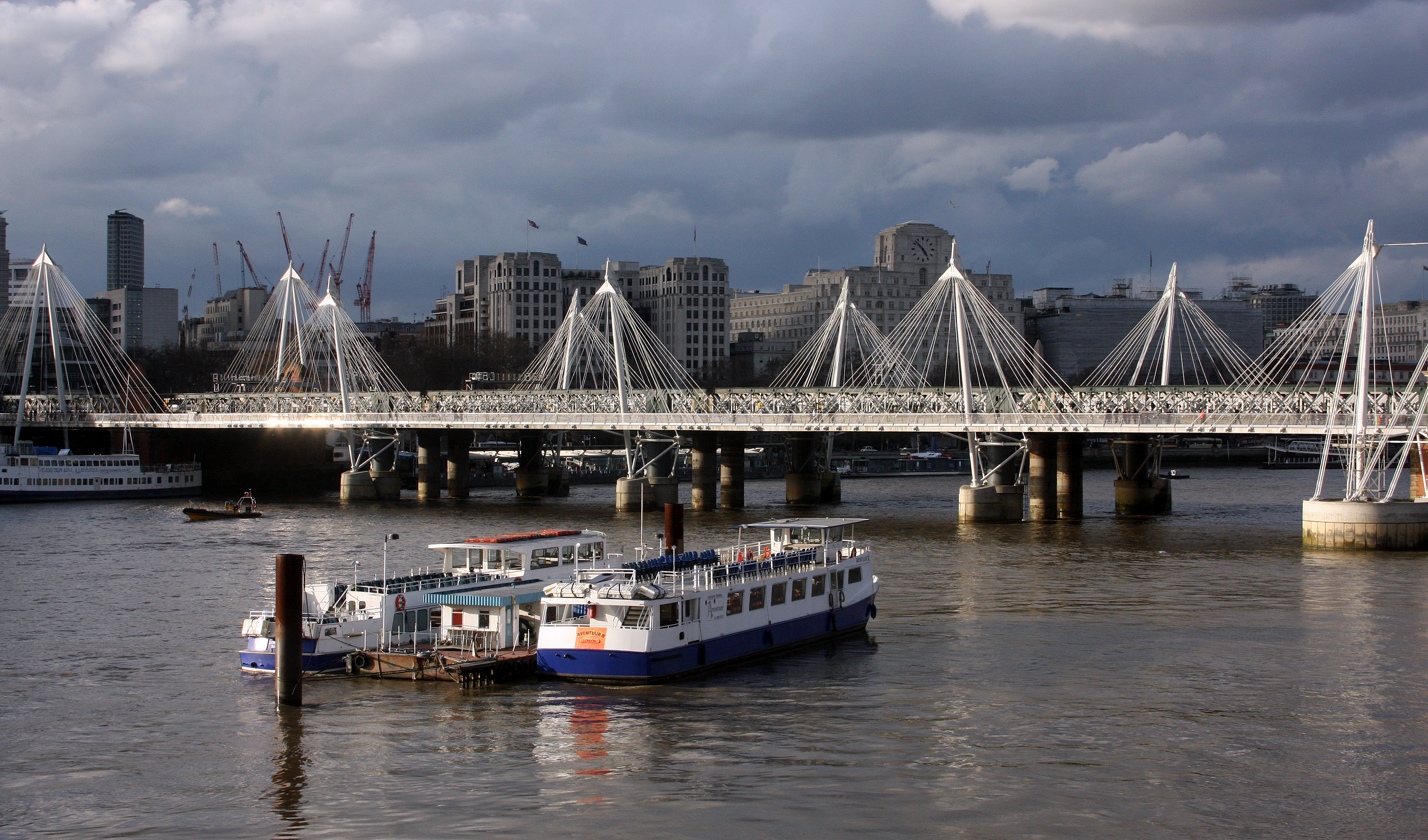
A picture of the Charing Cross Bridge (also known as the Hungerford Bridge) and the River Thames in London, England.

The 37 paintings share some common features. Across the horizon, Monet portrays the Charing Cross Bridge using thin lines. Although the bridge is consistent across his paintings, it is not entirely representative of the actual bridge. John Sweetnam explains, "Comparisons with the actual bridge show that Monet compressed the solid and open parts of the deck into a mass that is both more consolidated and more extreme in its horizontally."

Although the paintings share much in common, they also have notable differences. In certain versions, Monet includes an obscured train that blows smoke as it travels across the bridge. Some paintings depict a small boat in the bottom left corner; others depict Big Ben and the Victoria Tower in the top right corner. The towers are shadowy outlines at best, leading Rebecca Stern to suggest that Monet "obscures all record of standardized time in his series.”

== Interpretation ==
In this series, Monet represents the same subject in various conditions of light and atmosphere. Specifically, Monet was both captivated and challenged by the ways in which the ever-changing London fog affected the appearance of the bridge. In each of the paintings, Monet surrounds the bridge with enveloppe, a term that he himself defined as "the same light spread over everything." John House further describes this concept, writing that this "colored atmospheric cloak... allowed... [Monet] to give his paintings, both singly and when exhibited in groups, the internal coherence and unity he sought." Indeed, Monet experimented with ambience throughout his career, as seen in his Haystacks, Rouen Cathedral, and Water Lilies series.

In addition to building upon his previous work, Monet builds upon the foundation laid by his contemporaries. Like Turner, Monet was intrigued by the interplay between subject matter and the outer, natural world. Sweetnam argues, "Charing Cross Bridge with its passing trains made up a subject in which subject content and light, as in Turner, were totally merged." Besides Turner's work, the Charing Cross Bridge series also parallels Whistler's work. In his Nocturne paintings, Whistler advocated for and succeeded in making London an acceptable subject of paintings. While Monet also sought to represent London in his paintings, he did not represent the city in the same muted colors that Whistler used. House views Monet's approach as "very different from that of his contemporaries... Monet's mists are suffused with delicate yet endlessly varied harmonies of colour."

== Gallery ==
Eight of the paintings in the Charing Cross Bridge series:

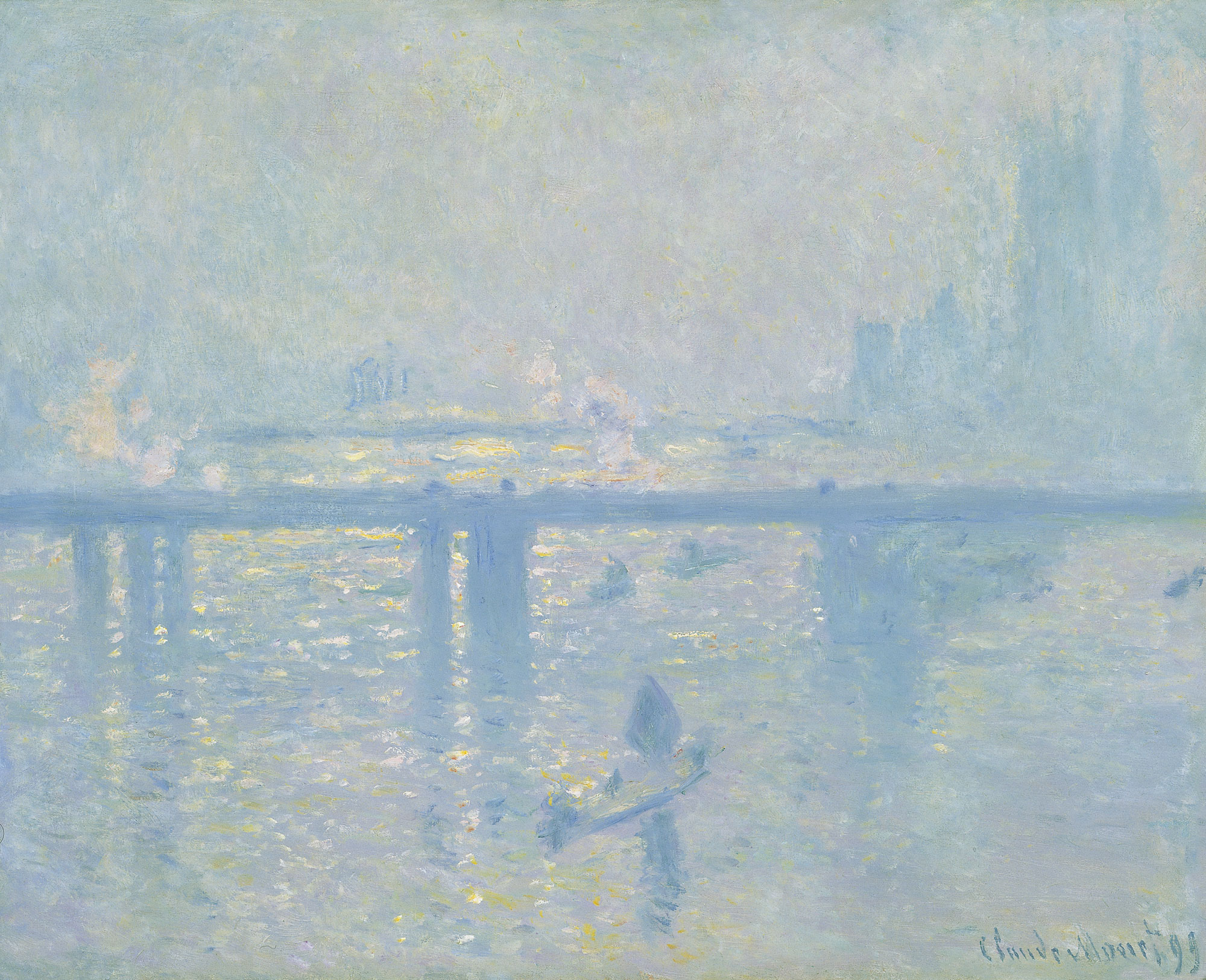
Charing Cross Bridge, 1899, Thyssen-Bornemisza Museum, Madrid

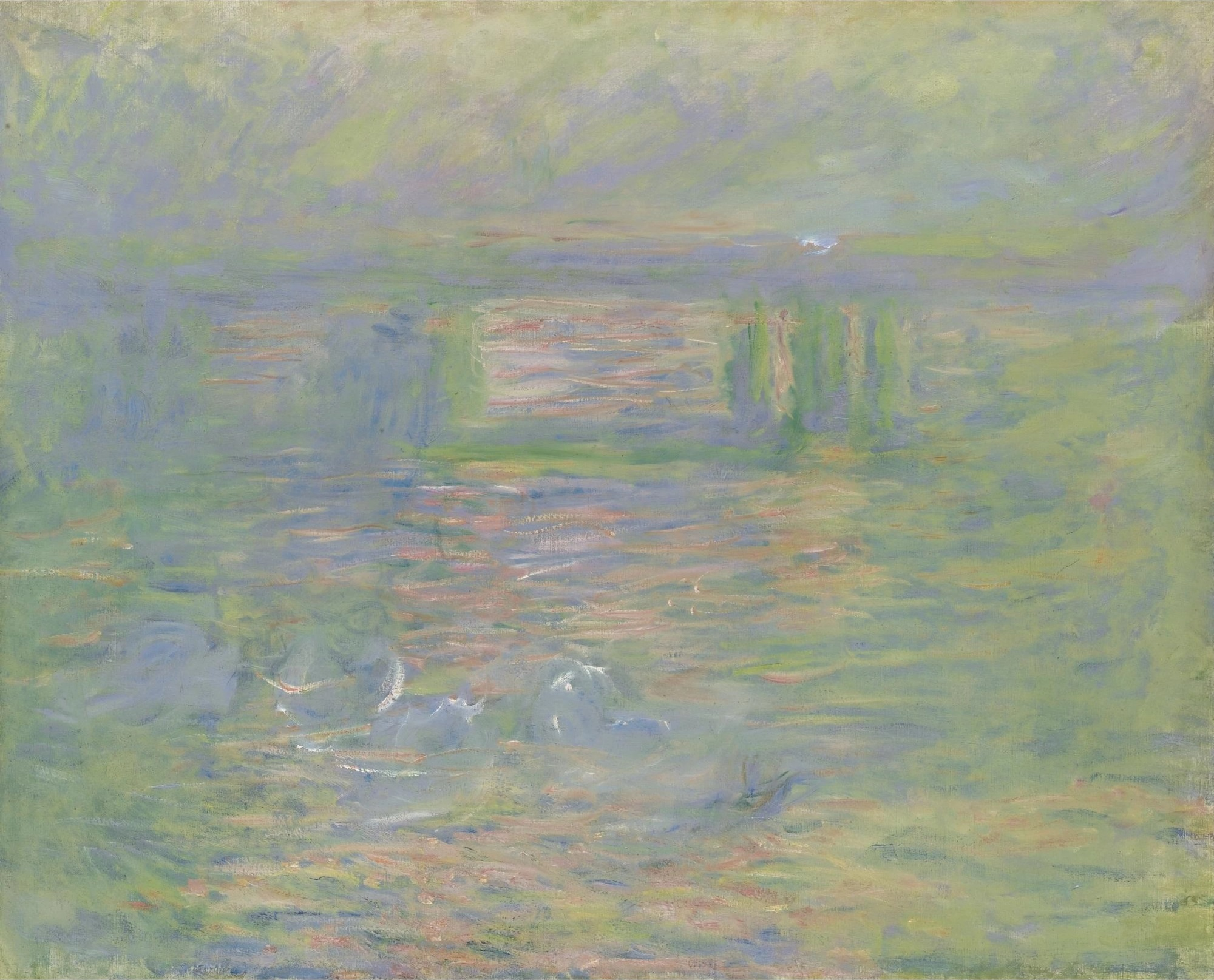
Charing Cross Bridge, c. 1899–1901, private collection

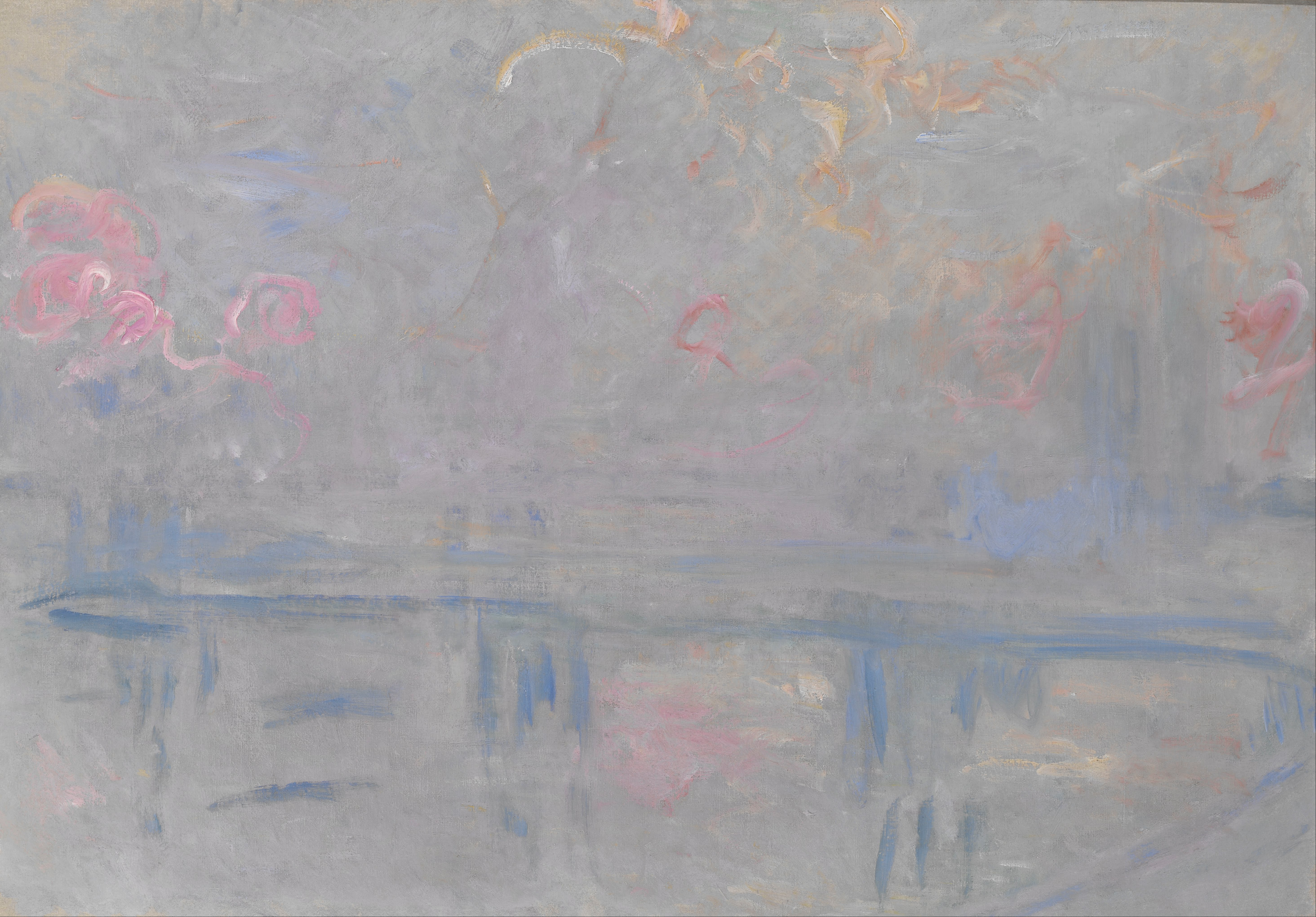
Charing Cross Bridge, c. 1900, Indianapolis Museum of Art

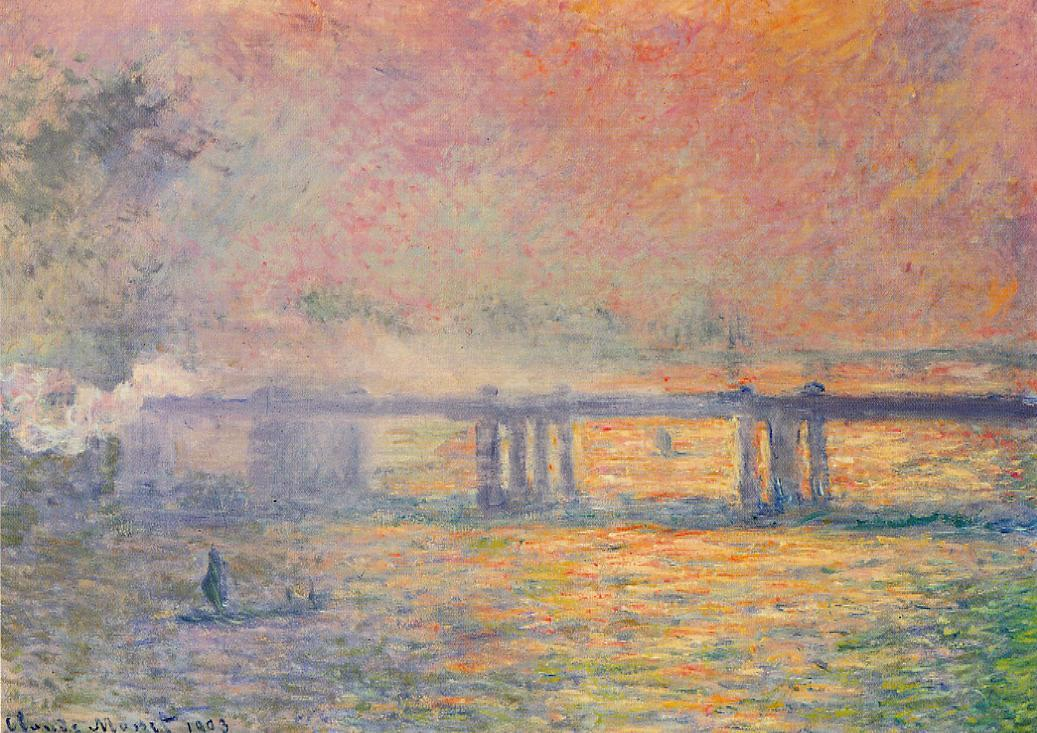
Charing Cross Bridge, London, 1899–1901, Saint Louis Art Museum

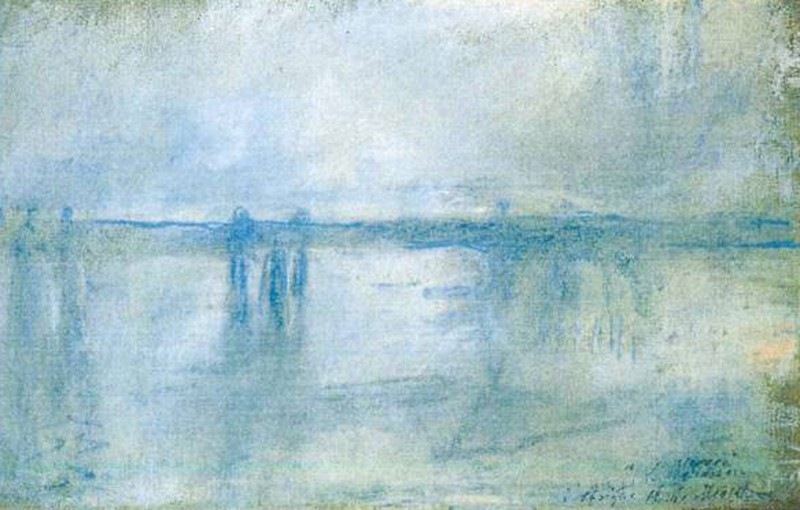
Charing Cross Bridge, London, 1901, Rotterdam police

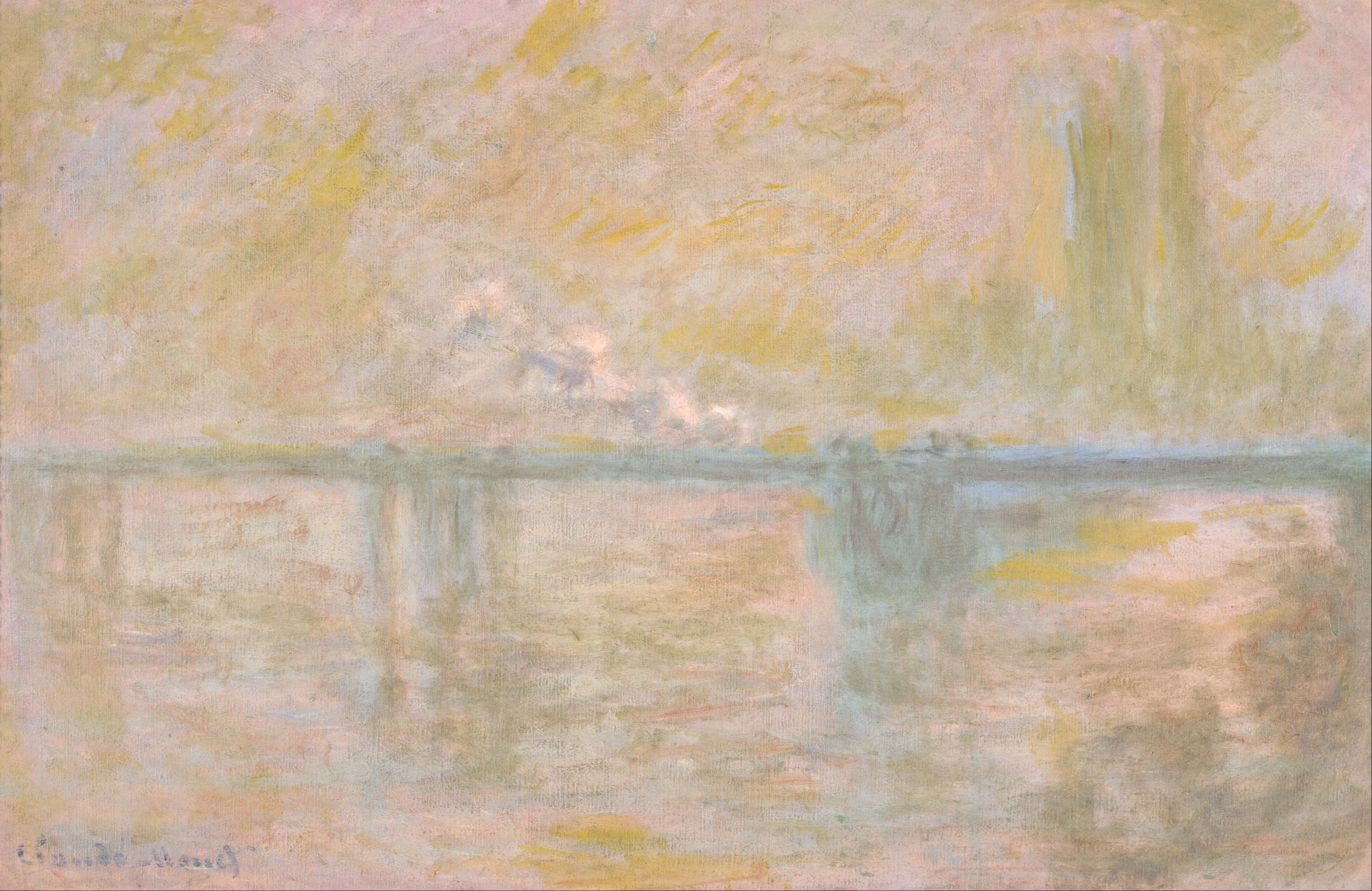
Charing-Cross Bridge in London, c. 1902, National Museum of Western Art, Tokyo

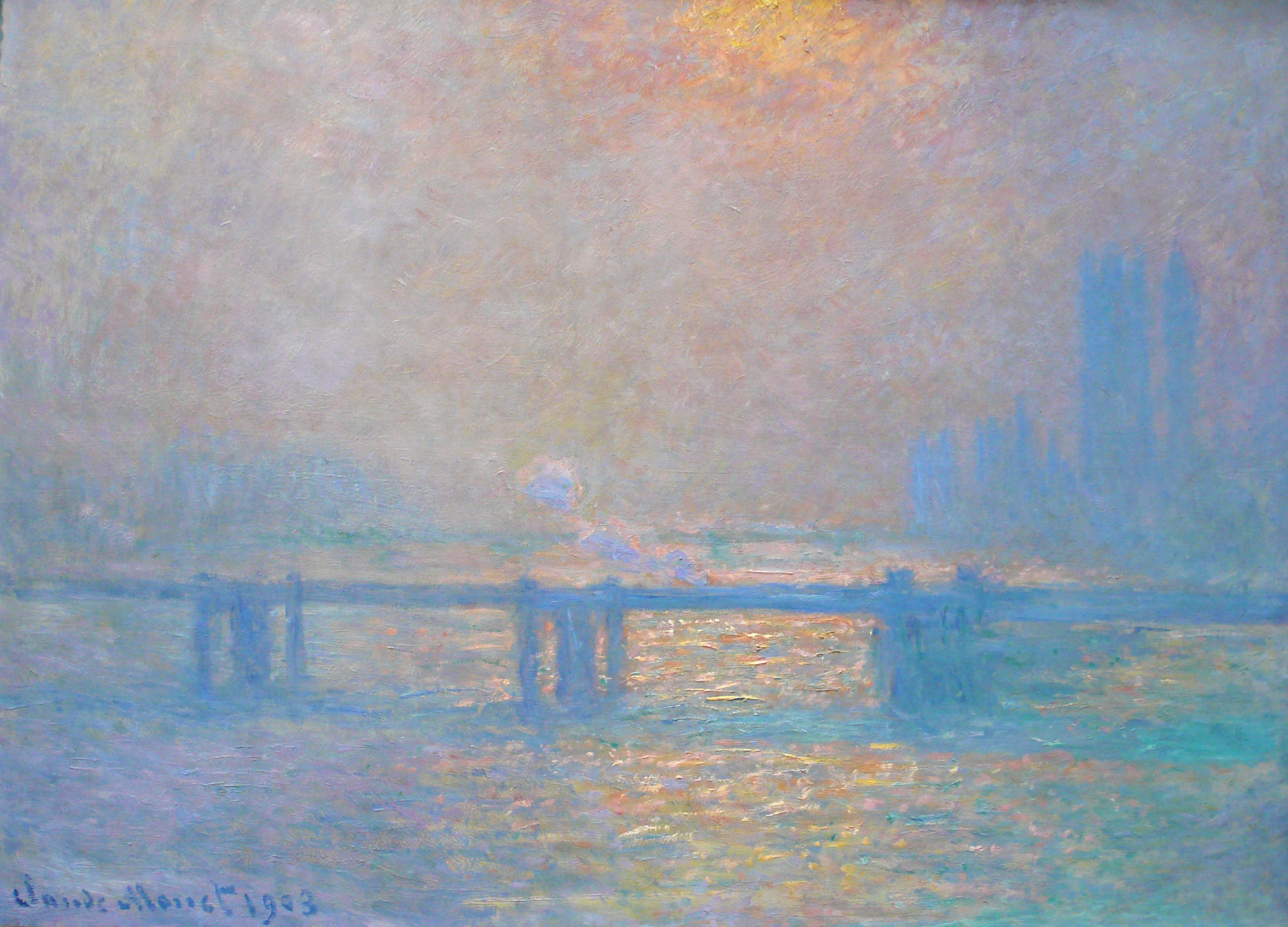
Charing Cross Bridge, 1903, Museum of Fine Arts of Lyon

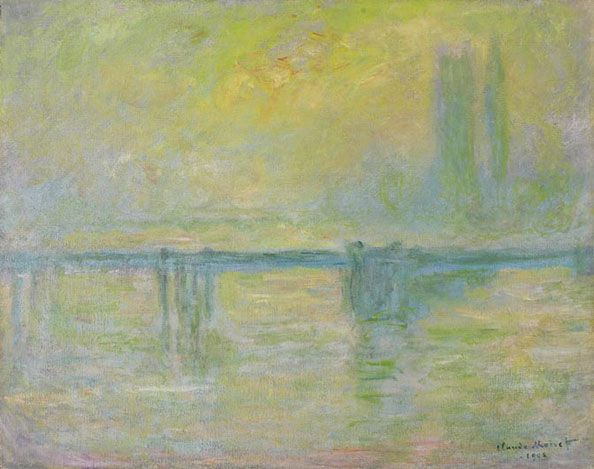
Charing Cross Bridge, Fog, 1902, Art Gallery of Ontario

== See also ==
- Haystacks (Monet series)
- Houses of Parliament (Monet series)
- Rouen Cathedral (Monet series)
- Water Lilies (Monet series)
- Waterloo Bridge (Monet series)
- List of paintings by Claude Monet
